German Americans are citizens of the United States who are of German ancestry; they form the largest ethnic ancestry group in the United States, accounting for 17% of U.S. population. The first significant numbers arrived in the 1680s in New York and Pennsylvania. Some eight million German immigrants have entered the United States since that point. Immigration continued in substantial numbers during the 19th century; the largest number of arrivals moved 1840–1900, when Germans formed the largest group of immigrants coming to the U.S., outnumbering the Irish and English. Some arrived seeking religious or political freedom, others for economic opportunities greater than those in Europe, and others for the chance to start afresh in the New World. California and Pennsylvania have the largest populations of German origin, with more than six million German Americans residing in the two states alone. More than 50 million people in the United States identify German as their ancestry; it is often mixed with other Northern European ethnicities. This list also includes people of German Jewish descent.

Americans of German descent live in nearly every American county, from the East Coast, where the first German settlers arrived in the 17th century, to the West Coast and in all the states in between. German Americans and those Germans who settled in the U.S. have been influential in almost every field, from science, to architecture, to entertainment, and to commercial industry.

Art and literature

Architects

 Dankmar Adler – architect
 Adolf Cluss – architect, builder of numerous public buildings in Washington, D.C.
 Ferdinand Gottlieb – architect heading his own firm, Ferdinand Gottlieb & Associates, based in Dobbs Ferry, New York
 Walter Gropius – pioneer in modern architecture, founder of Bauhaus
 Albert Kahn – industrial architect; known as the "architect of Detroit", of Jewish descent
 Richard Kiehnel – senior partner of Kiehnel, Elliot and Chalfant
 Henry C. Koch – architect based in Milwaukee, Wisconsin
 Joseph Molitor – Chicago-based church architect
 John A. Roebling – architect, known for designing the Brooklyn Bridge
 Washington Roebling – civil engineer known for his work on the Brooklyn Bridge, which was designed by his father John A. Roebling
 Frederick C. Sauer – architect, particularly in the Pittsburgh, Pennsylvania, region of the late 19th and early 20th centuries
 Frederick G. Scheibler Jr. – Art Nouveau Pittsburgh architect
 August Schoenborn – designed the United States Capitol Dome
 Hans Schuler – German-born American sculptor and monument maker; first American sculptor to win the Salon Gold Medal
 Adolph Strauch – landscape architect
 Horace Trumbauer – architect
 Ludwig Mies van der Rohe – pioneer of modern architecture, second Chicago School of Architecture
 Clarence C. Zantzinger – architect and public servant in Philadelphia, Pennsylvania

Artists

 Anni Albers – printmaker, textile artist
 Josef Albers – painter and graphic artist
 Leonard Bahr – portrait painter, muralist, illustrator and educator. He worked for many years as a painting professor at the Maryland Institute College of Art (MICA)
 Earl W. Bascom – painter, printmaker, and sculptor ("Cowboy of Cowboy Artists")
 Robert Benecke – early photographer
 Albert Bierstadt – painter, known for his large landscapes of the American West
 Richard Bock – sculptor and associate of Frank Lloyd Wright
 Charles Dellschau – one of America's earliest known outsider artists, draftsman engineer, creating drawings, collages and watercolors of airplanes and airships
 Rudolph Dirks – comic strip artist who created The Katzenjammer Kids
 Alfred Eisenstaedt – photographer and photojournalist best remembered for his photograph capturing the celebration of V-J Day
 Jimmy Ernst – German-born artist
 Carl Eytel – German-born artist of desert landscapes living in early 20th-century Palm Springs, California
 Claire Falkenstein – sculptor, painter, print-maker and jewelry designer known for her large-scale abstract metal and glass sculptures
 Andreas Feininger – photographer and writer on photographic technique
 Lyonel Feininger – painter and caricaturist
 Steven Fischer – film producer and cartoonist
 Carl Giers – early photographer
 George Grosz – member of the Berlin Dada and New Objectivity group, known especially for his savagely caricatural drawings of Berlin life in the 1920s
 Don Heck – comics artist best known for co-creating the Marvel Comics characters Iron Man and the Wasp, and for his long run penciling the Marvel superhero-team series The Avengers during the 1960s Silver Age of comic books
 Uli Herzner – fashion designer
 Hans Hofmann – abstract expressionist painter
 Ubbe Ert Iwwerks – Academy Award-winning animator, cartoonist and special effects technician, famous for his work for Walt Disney
 Klaus Janson – comic book artist (inker), working regularly for Marvel Comics and DC Comics and sporadically for independent companies
 Ulli Kampelmann – painter and filmmaker
 Kenya (Robinson) – multimedia artist whose work includes performance, sculpture and installation
 Charles Kleibacker – fashion designer who earned the nickname "Master of the Bias"
 Franz Jozef Kline – abstract expressionist painter
 Harold Knerr – illustrator of The Katzenjammer Kids until 1949
 Fritz Kredel - woodcut artist and illustrator known for fairy tale and young readers' fiction drawings, delicate and hand-colored botanical woodcuts, and US and European armies' uniforms over time. He captured favorite stories and his childhood before WWII.  
 John Lewis Krimmel – America's first genre painter
 Emanuel Leutze – history painter best known for his painting Washington Crossing the Delaware
 Cornelius Krieghoff – painter
 Nicola Marschall – artist, designed the first Confederate flag and the Confederate uniform
 Louis Maurer – lithographer
 David Muench – landscape and nature photographer known for portraying the American western landscape
 Marc Muench – sports and landscape photographer
 Charles Christian Nahl – painter who is called California's first significant artist
 Thomas Nast – political cartoonist
 Elisabet Ney – sculptor
 Erwin Panofsky – art historian, of Jewish descent
 Julian Ritter – Classical Realist painter best known for his paintings of nudes, clowns and portraits and his ill-fated voyage of the South Pacific
 Severin Roesen – still life painter
 Paulus Roetter – landscape and botanical painter
 Christopher Sauer – earliest type founder in America, published the first German Bible, 1743, and the first religious magazine in America, 1764
 Frank Schoonover - illustrator who worked in Wilmington, Delaware. A member of the Brandywine School, he was a contributing illustrator to magazines and did more than 5,000 paintings.
 Christian Schwartz – type designer
 Christian Siriano – fashion designer
 Gustavus Sohon – artist
 Henry William Stiegel – glassmaker and ironmaster
 Alfred Stieglitz – photographer instrumental in making photography an acceptable art form alongside painting and sculpture
 Ruth VanSickle Ford – painter, art teacher, and owner of the Chicago Academy of Fine Arts
 Richard Veenfliet – artist known for illustration-figure, genre and landscape
 Patrizia von Brandenstein – production designer
 Kat Von D (Katherine von Drachenberg) – tattoo artist
 Elsa von Freytag-Loringhoven – avant-garde, Dadaist artist, and poet
 Franz von Holzhausen – vehicle designer and since 2008, he has been in charge of design at Tesla, Inc. He designed the Tesla Model S, Model 3, Model X, Model Y, and the unveiled but not-yet-released Cybertruck, Semi, and second-generation Tesla Roadster.
 Baroness Hilla von Rebay – abstract painter, helped establish the Solomon R. Guggenheim Museum in New York City
 Karl Ferdinand Wimar – painter

Authors and writers

 Kathy Acker – author
 Wendall Anschutz – television newsman for KCTV in Kansas City
 Sade Baderinwa – news reporter-journalist
 Matthias Bartgis – printer and publisher
 L. Frank Baum – author, actor, and independent filmmaker best known as the creator of The Wonderful Wizard of Oz
 Vicki Baum – writer
 Salvador Brau – journalist, poet, writer
 Gene Brewer – author of the K-PAX series of novels
 Charles Bukowski – poet and novelist
 Caspar Butz – journalist, politician
 George DiCaprio – writer, editor, and major west coast underground comic book distributor
 Theodore Dreiser – author of the naturalist school, known for dealing with the gritty reality of life
 Gottfried Duden – travel author
 Roger Ebert – Pulitzer Prize-winning film critic, journalist, and screenwriter
 Martin Ebon – author of non-fiction books from the paranormal to politics
 Max Ehrmann – widely known for his 1927 prose poem "Desiderata" (Latin: "things desired").
 Joseph Eiboeck – newspaper editor and publisher of Iowa Staats-Anzeiger and author of The Germans in Iowa and Their Achievements (1900)
 Charles Follen – poet and patriot
 Cornelia Funke – author
 James Grauerholz – writer, editor-in-chief, bibliographer, and literary executor of the estate of William S. Burroughs
 Bob Gretz – award-winning sportswriter and broadcaster
 Hans Halberstadt – author, filmmaker, historian and photographer
 Geoffrey Hartman – literary theorist
 Ursula Hegi – novelist
 Patricia Highsmith – novelist known for her psychological thrillers
 Friedrich Hirth – sinologue
 Max Hofmann – correspondent
 Amal Kassir – international award-winning spoken word poet.
 Stephen King – author
 Chuck Klosterman – writer
 Siegfried Kracauer – film historian, sociologist and author
 Herbert Arthur Krause – historian
 D.L. Lang – poet laureate of Vallejo, California
 Fritz Leiber – science fiction writer
 Walter Lippman – writer, journalist, and political commentator
 H. L. Mencken – journalist
 Henry Miller – writer and painter
 Anna Balmer Myers – author of Mennonite (Pennsylvania Dutch) novels
 Oswald Ottendorfer – journalist associated with the development of the German-language New Yorker Staats-Zeitung into a major newspaper
 Sylvia Plath – poet, novelist, and short story writer
 Frederik Pohl – science-fiction writer, editor
 Erich Maria Remarque – German-born author, naturalized United States citizen
 Conrad Richter – Pulitzer Prize-winning novelist
 Mary Roberts Rinehart – author
 Hope Rockefeller Aldrich – journalist
 Irma S. Rombauer – author of The Joy of Cooking
 Diane Sawyer – journalist
 Jack Schaefer – author of Shane
 Paul Schrader – screenwriter, film director, and film critic
 Peter Schweizer – author of Do as I Say (Not as I Do): Profiles in Liberal Hypocrisy and Clinton Cash
 Ernest Schwiebert – angling writer
 Charles Sealsfield – pseudonym of Austrian American author of novels and travelogues Carl (or Karl) Anton Postl
 Dr. Seuss (born Theodor Seuss Geisel) – writer and cartoonist
 Maria Shriver – journalist and author
 Mona Simpson – novelist and university professor, biological younger sister of the late Apple Inc. co-founder Steve Jobs
 Curt Siodmak – screenwriter
 Nicholas Sparks – author and screenwriter
 Gertrude Stein – author, of Jewish descent
 John Steinbeck – Nobel prize-winning author, one of the best-known and most widely read American writers of the 20th century
 Henry F. Urban – journalist, author
 Henry Villard – journalist
 Kurt Vonnegut – novelist
 Tessa Gräfin von Walderdorff – writer, socialite
 George Weigel – author; political and social activist

Businesspeople and entrepreneurs

 Philip Anschutz – billionaire businessman who owns or controls many companies in a variety of industries
 John Jacob Astor – business magnate, merchant and investor and the first multi-millionaire in the United States
 John Jacob Astor IV – millionaire businessman, real estate developer, inventor, writer and a lieutenant colonel in the Spanish–American War
 William Waldorf Astor, 1st Viscount Astor – financier and statesman
 George Frederick Baer – lawyer, Social Darwinist railroad baron (former President of the Reading Railroad)
 Ralph Baer – father of the home video game console, of German-Jewish descent
 John Jacob Bausch – optician who co-founded Bausch & Lomb
 Andy von Bechtolsheim – co-founder of Sun Microsystems and one of the first investors in Google
 Maximilian Berlitz – Berlitz Language School
 Isaac Wolfe Bernheim – businessman notable for starting the I. W. Harper brand of premium bourbon whiskey
 Bernard Baruch – financier, stock-market speculator, statesman, and political consultant
 William Edward Boeing – aviation pioneer who founded The Boeing Company
 Paul Bonwit – founder of Bonwit Teller department store in New York City
 Emil J. Brach, Founder of Brach's Candy
 George Brumder – newspaper publisher and businessman in Milwaukee, Wisconsin
 Clyde Cessna – aircraft designer, aviator, and founder of the Cessna Aircraft Corporation
 Walter Chrysler – Chrysler automobile developer
 George A. Dickel – whiskey distributor; born in Grünberg, Hesse
 Chris Deering – businessman and marketer best known for his role as president of Sony Computer Entertainment Europe
 Noah Dietrich – CEO of the Howard Hughes empire
 William S. Dietrich II – industrialist who took over and expanded Dietrich Industries, a steel framing manufacturer which he eventually sold to Worthington Industries. Late in life, he made two of the largest charitable contributions in higher education history, to the University of Pittsburgh and Carnegie Mellon University.
 Walt Disney – film producer, director, screenwriter, voice actor, animator, entrepreneur, and philanthropist
 John Doerr – venture capitalist at Kleiner Perkins Caufield & Byers
 Richard Driehaus – chairman of Driehaus Capital Management LLC
 August Duesenberg – automobile pioneer manufacturer
 Fred Duesenberg – automobile pioneer designer, manufacturer and sportsman
 Edward Filene – businessman, social entrepreneur and philanthropist
 Harvey Firestone – founder of the Firestone Tire and Rubber Company
 Nicholas C. Forstmann – one of the founding partners of Forstmann Little & Company, a private equity firm
 Theodore J. Forstmann – one of the founding partners of Forstmann Little & Company, a private equity firm, and chairman and CEO of IMG, a leading global sports and media company
 Bill Gates – software magnate and investor, founder and former chairman of Microsoft
 Daniel Frank Gerber – manufacturer of baby food
 Frank Daniel Gerber – manufacturer of baby food
 Henry Giessenbier – banker and founder of the Young Men's Progressive Civic Association in 1915 and the United States Junior Chamber in 1920
 Theodor August Heintzman – piano manufacturer (Heintzman & Co.) and inventor
 Henry J. Heinz – H. J. Heinz Company ketchup founder
 H. J. Heinz II – best known as Jack Heinz, a business executive and CEO of the H. J. Heinz Company
 H. Robert Heller – President and CEO of VISA U.S.A. and Federal Reserve Board of Governors
 Richard Hellmann – company founder of Hellmanns
 Joseph A. Hemann – educator, newspaper publisher, and banker
 Milton S. Hershey – Hershey chocolate founder
 Barron Hilton – chairman of the Hilton Hotel chain and grandfather of Paris Hilton
 Conrad Hilton – founder of the Hilton Hotel chain and great-grandfather of Paris Hilton and Nicky Hilton
 Richard Hilton – hotelier and real estate entrepreneur, father of Paris Hilton
 George A. Hormel – founder of Hormel Foods Corporation
 Steve Jobs – software tycoon, co-founder and CEO of Apple Inc.
 Max Kade – pharmaceutical tycoon, endowed the Max Kade Foundation
 Otto Hermann Kahn – investment banker
 Jawed Karim – co-founder of YouTube and designer of key parts of PayPal
 Edgar J. Kaufmann – department store entrepreneur
 William Myron Keck – oil entrepreneur and philanthropist who is now best known for giving his name to the W. M. Keck Foundation, one of the largest philanthropic foundations
 Peter Kern – confectioner and mayor of Knoxville, Tennessee
 John W. Kieckhefer – pioneer in the use of fibre shipping containers and one of the wealthiest men in America in 1957
 John Kluge – television industry mogul
 Klaus Kleinfeld – business executive
 William Knabe – industrialist and piano-manufacturer
 Lynne Koplitz – comedian
 James L. Kraft – first to patent processed cheese; founder of Kraft Foods
 Bernard Kroger – chain grocer founder of the Kroger chain
 Louis Kurz – major publisher of chromolithographs in the late 19th century
 Johan Adam Lemp – father of modern brewing in St. Louis, started the William J. Lemp Brewing Company
 James E. Lentz III – president of Toyota Motor Sales, USA
 Alfred Lion – co-founder of Blue Note Records
 Solomon Loeb – banker, co-founder of Kuhn, Loeb & Co., of Jewish descent
 Grover Loening – aircraft manufacturer
 Henry Lomb – co-founded Bausch & Lomb
 George Lucas – film director and producer, of part German ancestry
 William H. Luden – developer of the menthol cough drop, the first ever, Luden's Menthol Cough Drops
 Adolph Luetgert – Chicago businessman of A.L. Luetgert Sausage & Packing Company
 Peter Luger – steak restaurateur
 Abby Rockefeller Mauzé – philanthropist
 Oscar Mayer – meat entrepreneur
 Frederick L. Maytag – founder of the Maytag Company
 George W. Merck – scientist and former president of Merck & Co
 Fred G. Meyer – founder of Fred Meyer
 Maxey Dell Moody Jr. – founder of MOBRO Marine, Inc. and CEO of M. D. Moody & Sons, Inc.
 Elon Musk – co-founder of  PayPal Inc.; founder of SolarCity, SpaceX, Hyperloop, and Tesla Motors
 Carrie Marcus Neiman – co-founder of the Neiman-Marcus department store
 Douglas R. Oberhelman – former CEO and Executive Chairman of Caterpillar Inc. in Peoria, Illinois
 Adolph Ochs-Sulzberger – newspaper publisher and former owner of The New York Times and The Chattanooga Times (now the Chattanooga Times Free Press)
 Hermann Oelrichs – shipping magnate and owner of Norddeutsche Lloyd Shipping
 Albrecht Pagenstecher – pioneer of the modern paper industry
 Fabian Pascal – consultant to large software vendors
 Charles Pfizer – founded the Pfizer Inc. pharmaceutical company
 John C. Pritzlaff – founder of the John Pritzlaff Hardware Company, the largest wholesale hardware store in the Midwestern United States until its closure in 1958
 Robert Propst – inventor of the Action Office that evolved into the cubicle office furniture system
 John J. Raskob – builder of the Empire State Building
 Francis Joseph Reitz – banker, civic leader, and philanthropist
 John Augustus Reitz – known as the "Lumber Baron", an entrepreneur, industrialist, banker, civic leader, and philanthropist
 George Remus – famous Cincinnati lawyer and bootlegger during the Prohibition era
 Adolph Rickenbacher – created the electric guitar manufacturer, Rickenbacher Manufacturing Company
 William Rittenhouse – built the first paper mill in America
 David Rockefeller – banker, philanthropist, world statesman, and the current patriarch of the Rockefeller family
 John D. Rockefeller – oil magnate and philanthropist
 John D. Rockefeller Jr. – industrialist and philanthropist
 John D. Rockefeller III – industrialist and philanthropist
 Laurance Rockefeller – venture capitalist, financier, philanthropist and major conservationist
 John Augustus Roebling – civil engineer, one of the pioneers in the construction of suspension bridges
 Washington Roebling – civil engineer best known for his work on the Brooklyn Bridge
 Jim Rohr – chairman and CEO of PNC Financial Services (PNC Bank)
 Jacob Ruppert – brewer, businessman, National Guard colonel and United States Congressman, owner of New York Yankees from 1915 until 1939
 August Schell – founded The August Schell Brewing Company in 1860, the second oldest family-owned brewery in America
 Walter Schlage – engineer, inventor, and businessman; founder of Schlage Manufacturing company in San Francisco
 John Schnatter – founder of Papa John's Pizza
 Jacob Schiff – banker and philanthropist
 Julius Schmid – creator of the Sheik condom and the Ramses condom
 Eric Schmidt – executive chairman and former CEO of Alphabet Inc. (the parent company of Google) and a former member of the board of directors of Apple Inc., and 136th-wealthiest person in the world in 2011
 Charles M. Schwab – steel magnate (Bethlehem Steel)
 Charles R. Schwab – businessman and investor; founder of the Charles Schwab Corporation
 Steve Schwarzman – private equity mogul, financier and founder of Blackstone Group
 Frank Seiberling – inventor and founder of the Goodyear Tire and Rubber Company, Seiberling Rubber Company, Stan Hywet Hall and Gardens
 John Seiberling – founder and inventor of one of the first reaping machines
 Isaac Singer – inventor, actor, and sewing machine entrepreneur
 Evan Spiegel – Internet entrepreneur; co-founder and CEO of the mobile application Snapchat
 Joseph Spiegel – founder of Spiegel catalog
 Claus Spreckels – industrialist
 George Steinbrenner – shipping and sports franchise entrepreneur and late owner of the New York Yankees
 Heinrich Engelhard Steinweg – Steinway pianos manufacturer
 Henry William Stiegel – glassmaker and ironmaster and an active lay Lutheran and associate of Henry Melchior Muhlenberg
 Chris Strachwitz – founder and president of Arhoolie Records
 Levi Strauss – creator of the first company to manufacture blue jeans; of German-Jewish descent
 Clement Studebaker – founded Studebaker, a wagon, carriage and car manufacturer
 Arthur Hays Sulzberger – publisher of The New York Times, 1935–1961
 John Sutter – pioneer settler/colonizer
 Peter Thiel – co-founder of  PayPal Inc.; first outside investor in Facebook, Inc.
 Otto Timm – aircraft manufacturer
 Robert Uihlein Jr. – heir, businessman, polo player and philanthropist
 William Utz – snack food entrepreneur
 Frederick Vogel – tanner and businessman from Milwaukee, Wisconsin, who spent a single one-year term as a member of the Wisconsin State Assembly
 Charles Von der Ahe – co-founder of the Vons Supermarket chain
 Wilfred Von der Ahe – co-founder of the Vons Supermarket chain
 The Warburg Family – bankers, of Jewish descent
 John Wanamaker – founder of Wanamaker's department store
 George Westinghouse – engineer and electricity pioneer
 Oscar Werwath – founder and first president of the Milwaukee School of Engineering in Milwaukee, Wisconsin
 Friedrich Weyerhäuser – timber mogul and founder of the Weyerhaeuser
 Francis Wolff – co-founder of Blue Note Records
 Rudolph Wurlitzer – musical instrument entrepreneur
 William Zeckendorf – real estate developer
 Frederick G. Zinsser – American chemical company entrepreneur who founded Zinsser & Company, which synthesized organic chemicals.

Brewers 

 Eberhard Anheuser – soap and candle maker, president and CEO of Eberhard Anheuser and Company, which eventually became Anheuser-Busch
 Valentin Blatz – beer baron, started the Valentin Blatz Brewing Company
 Adolphus Busch – Anheuser-Busch brewing company founder
 Adolphus Busch III – brewing magnate who was the President and CEO of Anheuser-Busch, 1934–1946
 August Anheuser Busch Sr. – brewing magnate who served as the President and CEO of Anheuser-Busch, 1913–1934
 August Busch IV – president and CEO of Anheuser-Busch
 Gussie Busch – brewing magnate who built the Anheuser-Busch Companies into the largest brewery in the world as company chairman, 1946–1975, and became a prominent sportsman as owner of the St. Louis Cardinals franchise in MLB
 Adolph Coors – Coors beer empire founder
 Matthias Haffen – New York City brewer, formerly located at the Haffen Building in the Bronx
 Theodore Hamm – founder of Hamm's Brewery
 Frederick Miller – Miller beer creator
 Frederick Pabst – founder of Pabst Brewery (with Philip Best)
 Tom Pastorius – founded Penn Brewery (Pennsylvania Brewing Co.)
 Frederick Schaefer – beer baron, started F. & M. Schaefer Brewing Company
 Joseph Schlitz – beer baron, founded Joseph Schlitz Brewing Company
 Kosmas Spoetzl – brewer, Shiner Brewery
 Peter P. Straub – founder of Straub Brewery
 August Uihlein – Uhrig Brewery and Joseph Schlitz Brewing Company brewer, business executive and horse breeder
 Herman Weiss – first brewmaster in Shiner, Texas; hired in 1909 by the Shiner Brewing Association to start the brewery; later took the same position at the San Antonio Brewing Association

Distillers 
 Arthur Phillip Stitzel – founder of the Stitzel–Weller Distillery, which has produced a number of notable brands, and as of 2017 houses the welcome center and public tour for Bulleit Bourbon, as part of the Kentucky Bourbon Trail

Entertainment

Actors

 Jensen Ackles – actor
 Gideon Adlon – actress
 Ben Affleck – actor and filmmaker
 Casey Affleck – actor and director
 Eddie Albert (born Edward Albert Heimberger) – Academy Award- and Primetime Emmy Award-nominated American stage, film, character actor, gardener, humanitarian activist, and World War II hero
 Tim Allen – actor and comedian
 Woody Allen (born Allan Stewart Konigsberg) – filmmaker, writer, actor, comedian, and musician, of Jewish descent
 Mädchen Amick – actress
 Fred Armisen
 Fred Astaire – dancer, singer, actor, choreographer, and television presenter
 Odessa A'zion – actress
 Catherine Bach – actress
 Diedrich Bader – actor
 Haley Bennett – actress
 Hailey Baldwin – actress
 John Banner – actor
 Earl W. Bascom – film actor
 Kim Basinger – actress, small amount of German ancestry
 Brian Baumgartner – actor
 Stephanie Beatriz – actress
 Kristen Bell – actress
 Zazie Beetz – actress
 Candice Bergen – actress; mother Frances Bergen was of German descent
 Frances Bergen (née Westerman) – maternal grandparents of German descent
 Ingrid Bergman – actress; mother was an immigrant from Germany
 Halle Berry – actress
 Carl Betz – actor and World War II veteran
 Michael Biehn – actor
 Jessica Biel – actress, small amount of German ancestry, also of Jewish descent
 Karen Black – actress
 Curt Bois – actor
 Johnny Yong Bosch – actor, of partial paternal German descent
 Julie Bowen – actress, of part German ancestry
 Eric Braeden – actor
 Marlon Brando – actor; father was of partial German ancestry
 Benjamin Bratt – actor; father is of mostly German ancestry
 Hermann Braun – actor
 Felix Bressart – actor
 Agnes Bruckner – actress, of part German descent
 Sandra Bullock – actress; mother was an immigrant from Germany, father had some German ancestry
 Ty Burrell – actor
 Scott Caan – actor
 Nicolas Cage – actor
 Nancy Cartwright
 Dana Carvey – actor, comedian, and producer
 Loan Chabanol – actress
 Sarah Chalke – actress; mother is an immigrant from Germany
 Carol Channing – actor, of 3/4 German and 1/4 African-American ancestry
 Claudia Christian – actress; mother is a German immigrant
 Mae Clarke (born Violet Mary Klotz) – actress
 Montgomery Clift – actor
 George Clooney – actor, director, producer, screenwriter, activist, businessman, and philanthropist
 Kevin Costner – actor, of part German descent
 Tom Cruise – actor; parents both of part German ancestry
 Tony Curtis (born Bernard Schwartz) – actor, German Jewish descent
 Willem Dafoe – actor
 Josh Dallas - actor
 Helmut Dantine – actor
 Doris Day – actress, singer
 Robert De Niro – actor; mother was of half German descent
 James Dean – actor, small amount of German ancestry
 Johnny Depp – actor, small amount of German ancestry
 Cameron Diaz – actress; mother of German descent
 Leonardo DiCaprio – actor, paternal grandmother was of German descent, and mother is an immigrant from Germany
 Angie Dickinson – actress
 Vin Diesel – actor; mother of part German ancestry
 Marlene Dietrich – actress; an immigrant from Germany
 Peter Dinklage – Primetime Emmy Award-winning actor, of part German descent
 Adam Driver – actor
 Patty Duke – actress; mother of Mackenzie Astin and Sean Astin; she's of one quarter German descent
 Kirsten Dunst – film actress and former model; German father, and maternal grandfather of German descent
 Aaron Eckhart – actor; father is of German ancestry, mother also has some German roots
 Zac Efron – actor, of part German descent
 Nicole Eggert – actress; father is a German immigrant
 Erika Eleniak – actress; mother is of Estonian and German ancestry
 Noah Emmerich – actor; father a German Jewish immigrant, mother of Eastern European Jewish descent
 Chris Evans – actor; father of half German ancestry
 Dakota Fanning – actress, of part German descent
 Elle Fanning – actress; younger sister of Dakota Fanning, of part German descent
 Tina Fey – writer, comedian, and Primetime Emmy Award-winning actress; father is of half German ancestry
 William Fichtner – actor
 Jenna Fischer – actress
 Carrie Fisher – actress, of part German descent
 Jodie Foster – actress; mother is of part German ancestry
 Dennis Franz (born Dennis Franz Schlachta) – award-winning actor; father was a German immigrant, mother was of German descent
 Brendan Fraser – actor
 Tatiana von Fürstenberg – rock singer and filmmaker; daughter of fashion designers Diane and Prince Egon von Fürstenberg
 James Garner (born James Scott Bumgarner) – actor; father is of German descent
 Clark Gable – actor
 Janet Gaynor – actress
 Mitzi Gaynor (born Francesca Marlene de Czanyi von Gerber) – actress, singer, and dancer
 Lillian Gish – actress
 Summer Glau – actress, of part German descent
 Karl Glusman – actor
 Crispin Glover – actor
 Betty Grable – actress, dancer, and singer
 Joel Gretsch – actor
 Andy Griffith – actor, of part German descent
 Harry Groener – three-time Tony Award nominee
 Lukas Haas – actor; father is a German immigrant
 Gene Hackman – actor; part German
 Thomas J. Hageboeck (1945–1996) – actor
 Uta Hagen – actress, an immigrant from Germany
 Jon Hamm – actor
 Chelsea Handler – comedian and actress; mother was German
 Daryl Hannah – actress
 Melora Hardin – actress and singer
 Mariska Hargitay – actress; mother is of half German descent
 Woody Harrelson – actor
 Cecilia Hart – television and stage actress, of Belgian, Cornish, Dutch, English, French-Canadian, German, Irish, Italian, Norwegian and Scottish descent.
 David Hasselhoff – actor, of one quarter German descent
 Anne Hathaway – actress, small amount of German ancestry
 Cole Hauser – film and television actor; father of part German descent
 Dwight Hauser – actor and film producer, of part German descent
 Wings Hauser – actor, director and film writer, of part German descent
 James Haven – actor, of part German descent
 Rita Hayworth – actress and dancer, of part German descent
 Bill Heck – actor
 Eileen Heckart – actress
 Katherine Heigl – actress, of mostly German descent
 Tricia Helfer
 Marg Helgenberger – actress, of mostly German descent
 Paul Henreid (born Paul Georg Julius Hernried Freiherr von Wassel-Waldingau)
 Richard Henzel – film, TV, and voice-over actor
 Edward Herrmann – television and film actor, of part German descent
 J. G. Hertzler – actor, author, screenwriter best known for his role on Star Trek: Deep Space Nine as the Klingon General (later Chancellor) Martok
 Emile Hirsch – actor
 Katie Holmes – actress, of part German ancestry
 Sofia Hublitz – actress
 Adam Huber - actor
 Rock Hudson – actor, of half German/Swiss-German descent
 Tab Hunter – film actor and singer, father was a German-Jewish immigrant, mother a German Lutheran immigrant
 Josh Hutcherson – actor
 Martha Hyer – Academy Award-nominated actress
 Gillian Jacobs – film, theater and television actress, of part German descent
 Emil Jannings – first actor to receive the Academy Award for Best Actor
 Van Johnson – film and television actor and dancer who was a major star at Metro-Goldwyn-Mayer studios during and after World War II, of part German descent
 Angelina Jolie (born Angelina Jolie Voight) – actress, of part German descent
 James Earl Jones – actor, of African American, Native American, English, French Huguenot, German, Irish, Scotch-Irish, Scottish, Swedish and Welsh descent.
 Leatrice Joy (born Leatrice Joy Zeidler) – silent film era actress
 Victoria Justice – actress; father of part German descent
 Vincent Kartheiser – actor
 Grace Kelly – actress; mother was of German ancestry
 Ellie Kemper – actress and comedian
 Nicole Kidman - actress, distant German ancestry
 Richard Kiel – actor
 Q'orianka Kilcher – actress and singer, of part Swiss-German descent
 Val Kilmer – actor
 Angela Kinsey – actress, of part German descent
 Chris Klein – actor, both parents of part German descent
 Werner Klemperer – actor
 Kevin Kline – actor; father was of German Jewish descent
 Johnny Knoxville – actor
 Boris Kodjoe – actor; mother of German and German-Jewish descent
 David Koechner – actor, comedian, and musician, of part German descent
 Lynne Koplitz – actor and comedian
 Fran Kranz – actor, of part German descent
 Kurt Kreuger – actor
 Diane Kruger – actress
 Mickey Kuhn – actor
 Ashton Kutcher – actor
 Cheryl Ladd – actress and model, of part German descent
 Veronica Lake – actress and pin-up model
 Jessica Lange – actress, paternal grandfather was of German descent
 Wesley Lau – film and television actor
 Cyndi Lauper – singer, actress, of part German descent
 Ed Lauter – actor, of part German descent
 Taylor Lautner – actor/martial artist, of part German descent
 Jennifer Lawrence – actress, of part German descent
 Bruce Lee – actor; father of Brandon Lee and Shannon Lee; Bruce's mother was of Chinese and German ancestry
 Janine Lindemulder – exotic dancer and adult film actress
 Kay Lenz – Emmy Award-winning actress
 Clara Lipman – actress and playwright; sister of Lieder singer Mattie Lipman Marum
 Blake Lively – actress, of part German descent
 Kristanna Loken – actress
 Carole Lombard – actress
 Julia Louis-Dreyfus – actress (Veep, Seinfeld, and The New Adventures of Old Christine); partly of German descent
 Chad Lowe – actor and director
 Rob Lowe – actor
 Kellan Lutz – fashion model and actor for television and films; of mostly German descent
 Matilda Lutz – actress
 Chloë Grace Moretz – actress
 Kaitlyn Maher – actress and singer
 John Malkovich – actor, of part German ancestry on his mother's side
 Jayne Mansfield – actress
 William Mapother – actor; Tom Cruise's cousin, of part German descent
 Marx Brothers – actors, of German Jewish descent
 Matthew McConaughey – actor, of part German descent
 Mia Malkova – pornographic actress, of part German descent
 Candice Michelle – model, actress, WWE wrestler
 Wentworth Miller – actor; father of part German descent
 Jason Momoa – actor; mother of part German descent
 Michelle Monaghan – actress
 Barbara Nichols – actress
 Jack Nicholson – actor and filmmaker
 Nick Nolte – actor, of part German descent
 Bob Odenkirk – actor
 Chris O'Donnell – actor who played Robin in two Batman films; mother is of part German ancestry
 Nick Offerman – actor and comedian
 Heather O'Rourke – child actress, of part German descent
 Chord Overstreet – of part German descent
 Jared Padalecki – actor, mother was part German
 Lilli Palmer (born Lillie Marie Peiser) – actress, German Jewish
 Gwyneth Paltrow – actress; daughter of Blythe Danner, who is of mostly German descent, also of Jewish descent
 Sarah Jessica Parker – actress; mother of mostly German descent, father of partial Jewish descent
 Penny Pax – adult film actress
 Gregory Peck – actor
 Evan Peters – actor, his parents both have German ancestry
 William Petersen – actor and producer, of mostly German descent
 Michelle Pfeiffer – actress; father was of half German ancestry
 Joaquin Phoenix – actor, father had part German ancestry
 Brad Pitt – actor, of part German descent, and fluent in the German language
 Amy Poehler – actress, comedian, producer and writer, of 1/8th German descent
 Erich Pommer – actor and film producer
 Chris Pratt – actor, of part German descent, and has limited proficiency in the German language
 Laura Prepon – actress; mother is part German
 Freddie Prinze Jr. – actor
 Jürgen Prochnow – actor
 George Raft (born George Ranft) – actor; father was an immigrant from Germany and mother was of German descent
 Luise Rainer – actress, Jewish immigrant from Germany
 John Ratzenberger – actor with part German American father
 Donna Reed – actress, of part German descent
 Frank Reicher – German-born American actor, director and producer
 Jeremy Renner – actor and musician, father is of part German ancestry
 Denise Richards – actress
 Molly Ringwald – actress
 Naya Rivera – actress and singer (a quarter German descent)
 Julia Roberts – actress and producer
 Isabella Rossellini – actress, daughter of Ingrid Bergman; maternal grandmother was German
 Andrew Rothenberg – television actor
 Mercedes Ruehl – theater, television and film actor; father was of part German descent
 Katee Sackhoff – actress, of part German descent
 William Sadler – film and television actor
 Roy Scheider – actor; father was of German descent
 August Schellenberg – actor
 Kendall Schmidt – actor and singer – well known for his part in Big Time Rush
 Danielle Schneider – actress, comedian, and writer
 Helen Schneider – actress and singer
 John Schneider – actor and singer
 Liev Schreiber – actor
 Pablo Schreiber – actor
 Ricky Schroder – actor and film director
 Carly Schroeder – actress and model
 Brooke Shields – actress with distant German ancestors
 Tom Selleck – actor
 Amanda Seyfried – actress, of heavily German descent
 Sherri Saum – actress with German mother
 Elke Sommer – actress
 Josef Sommer – actor, immigrant from Germany
 Shannyn Sossamon – actress, dancer, model, and musician, of part German descent
 Nick Stahl – actor, of part German descent
 Frances Sternhagen – actress
 Emma Stone – actress, of part German descent
 Michael Strahan – retired football player, actor, and television personality; lived in Germany
 Meryl Streep – actress; father was of German/Swiss-German descent, mother was of part German ancestry
 Ethan Stiefel – dancer, choreographer, and director
 Jeremy Sumpter – actor, of part German descent
 Carl Switzer – "Alfalfa", actor, professional dog breeder and hunting guide
 Ralph Taeger – actor
 Channing Tatum – actor, distant German ancestry
 Shirley Temple – actress, part German
 Alexis Texas – pornographic actress
 Charlize Theron – actress; mother has German ancestry 
 Jonathan Taylor Thomas (born Jonathan Taylor Weiss) – actor, best known for Home Improvement
 Uma Thurman – actress; mother is model Nena von Schlebrügge, of half German descent
 Rip Torn – actor and voice actor
 Liv Tyler – actress, of part German descent
 Alida Valli (Maria Laura Altenburger von Marckenstein-Frauenberg) – actress
 Mario Van Peebles – actor and director; mother is German
 Mike Vogel – actor
 Jon Voight – actor; maternal grandparents were immigrants from Germany
 Erik von Detten – actor; father is German
 Jenna von Oÿ – actress and singer
 Christopher Walken – actor; father was an immigrant from Germany
 Paul Walker – actor, of part German descent
 Erin Wasson – actress and model
 Johnny Weissmuller – Olympic swimmer, actor, best known as Tarzan
 Lois Weber – silent film actress, screenwriter, producer, and director. She is identified in some historical references as "the most important female director the American film industry has known"
 George Wendt – actor, of part German descent
 Frank Welker – actor
 Mae West – actress, playwright, screenwriter, and sex symbol; mother was an immigrant from Germany
 Vera-Ellen Westmeier Rohe – actress and dancer
 Bruce Willis – actor; mother was German
 Henry Winkler – actor, comedian, director, producer, and author (parents were German Jews)
 Frank Wolff – actor
 Elijah Wood – actor; father of half German descent; mother has one quarter German ancestry
 Kari Wuhrer – actress and singer, of part German descent
 Wolfgang Zilzer – actor
 Zendaya – (born Zendaya Maree Stoermer Coleman) actress; mother of German descent

Celebrities

 Glenn Beck – political commentator
 Benjamin C. Bradlee (1921-2014) – editor-in-chief of the Washington Post during the Watergate scandal; maternal great-grandfather was Dr. Ernst Bruno von Gersdorff
 Samantha Brown (born 1970) – television host of several Travel Channel programs
 Pat Buchanan – political commentator
 Kristin Cavallari – television personality, fashion designer, and actress
 Katie Couric – television and online journalist, presenter, producer, and author; mother and maternal grandparents were Jewish German
 Walter Cronkite – broadcast journalist, best known as anchorman for the CBS Evening News for 19 years (1962–1981)
 Jeanne Dixon –  born Lydia Emma Pinckert, astrologer and self-proclaimed psychic, columnist
 Mark Edward Fischbach – YouTuber and actor; father is German American
 Siegfried Fischbacher – magician
 Willie Geist – television personality, journalist and humorist
 Nicky Hilton – businesswoman, socialite, model, member of the former Hilton Hotel owners family
 Paris Hilton – businesswoman, socialite, model, member of the former Hilton Hotel owners family
 James Holzhauer (born 1984) – game show contestant and professional sports gambler, he is the fourth highest-earning American game show contestant of all time and is best known for his record-setting 2019 run as champion on the quiz show Jeopardy!
 Roy Horn – magician
 Kris Jenner – socialite
 Kendall Jenner – socialite and model
 Kylie Jenner – socialite, model, media personality, businesswoman, and billionaire from Kylie Cosmetics
 Alex Jones – conspiracy theorist
 Khloe Kardashian – socialite and model
 Kourtney Kardashian – socialite and model
 Kim Kardashian – television personality, socialite, actress, businesswoman, and model
 Megyn Kelly – journalist, attorney, talk show host
 Jimmy Kimmel – comedian, writer, late night talk show host, game show host, and producer
 Tomi Lahren – political commentator
 Alicia Menendez – television journalist
 Bridget Marquardt – model and TV personality (maiden name Sandmeier), reality TV star
 Jenny McCarthy – model, author, activist, actress, Playboy Playmate of the Year, and television personality
 Keith Olbermann – news anchor, sports and political commentator, and radio sportscaster
 Jeff Probst – Primetime Emmy Award-winning host, game show host, and executive producer
 Brad Rutter – game show contestant, TV host, producer, and actor; highest-earning American game show contestant of all time and the highest-earning contestant on the U.S. syndicated game show Jeopardy!
 Judy Sheindlin – television personality, television producer, author, former prosecutor and family court judge
 Stassi Schroeder – television personality, podcast host, author, fashion blogger, and model
 Ed Schultz – television and radio host, liberal political commentator, former sports broadcaster
 Jerry Springer – television personality of German-Jewish descent, journalist, comedian
 Ruth Westheimer (born 1928) –  known as "Dr. Ruth," sex therapist, talk show host, author, professor, Holocaust survivor, and former Haganah sniper.

Composers and musicians

 Anastacia (full name: Anastacia Lyn Newkirk) – singer, songwriter, and former dancer
 George Antheil – avant-garde composer, pianist, author, and inventor whose modernist musical compositions explored the modern sounds – musical, industrial, mechanical – of the early 20th century
 Bibi Bourelly – singer
 Andy Biersack — lead singer of Black Veil Brides
 Bix Beiderbecke – jazz cornet player and a classical and jazz pianist
 Jon Bon Jovi – singer and musician
 Eva Cassidy – singer
 J. Cole – rapper, songwriter, record producer
 Tre Cool – punk rocker (born in Frankfurt, West Germany)
 Patrick Dahlheimer – bassist for the band Live
 Walter Johannes Damrosch – conductor
 John Denver (born Henry John Deutschendorf Jr.) – musician
 Edsel Dope (born Brian Ebejer) – lead singer of Dope
 Dave Dudley – (born David Darwin Pedruska) – country music singer
 David Ellefson – co-founder of thrash metal band Megadeth
 Eminem – rapper and actor
 Nancy Faust – former stadium organist for Major League Baseball's Chicago White Sox
 Lukas Foss – conductor
 Chris Frantz – musician and record producer; the drummer for both Talking Heads and the Tom Tom Club
 Norman Frauenheim – acclaimed pianist and music teacher
 Ace Frehley – band member of Kiss
 Hugo Friedhofer – film music composer
 Louis F. Gottschalk – composer
 Dave Grohl – musician
 Hilary Hahn – violinist
 Daryl Hall – born Daryl Hohl, rock, R&B, and soul singer; keyboardist, guitarist, songwriter, and producer, best known as the co-founder and principal lead vocalist of Hall & Oates (with guitarist and songwriter John Oates)
 Jeff Hanneman – guitarist of Slayer
 Reinhold Heil – film and television composer
 Otto K. E. Heinemann – manager for the U.S. branch of German-owned Odeon Records
 James Hetfield – vocalist, rhythm guitarist and co-founder of Metallica
 Elbert Joseph Higgins – songwriter
 Paul Hindemith – composer, violinist and teacher
 Hanya Holm – choreographer
 Horst P. Horst – photographer
 Terry Kath – first guitarist of the rock band Chicago, 1966–1978; German mother
 Josh Kaufman – singer-songwriter and season six winner of NBC's The Voice
 John Kay (born Joachim Fritz Krauledat) – rock singer, songwriter, and guitarist known as the frontman of Steppenwolf
 John Kiffmeyer – first drummer of the punk rock band Green Day
 Otto Klemperer – conductor
 Alison Krauss – bluegrass-country singer, songwriter, and musician
 Nick Lachey – pop singer
 Armando Lichtenberger Jr. – Member of musical band La Mafia
 Charles Martin Loeffler – composer
 Courtney Love – actress and frontwoman of Hole
 Marilyn Manson – front man of rock band Marilyn Manson; father is of German descent
 Martina McBride – née Schiff, country music singer-songwriter and record producer
 Melissa Auf der Maur – rock singer
 Alyson Michalka – actress, singer-songwriter, and guitarist
 Amanda Michalka – actress, singer-songwriter, and guitarist
 Sanford A. Moeller – rudimental drummer, national champion, educator, author and Spanish–American War veteran
 Tomo in der Mühlen – DJ, producer and guitar player, known for work with Harold Perrineau, Masta Ace, Styles P, and Ekatarina Velika
 Dave Mustaine – co-founder of thrash metal band Megadeth and first lead guitarist for thrash metal band Metallica
 James Pankow – trombone player for the rock band Chicago
 Jaco Pastorius – musician and songwriter widely acknowledged for his virtuosity with the fretless bass
 Jaan Patterson – founder of the Surrism-Phonoethics label, also known as Undress Béton
 Les Paul (born Lester William Polsfuss) – jazz, country, and blues guitarist, songwriter, luthier, and inventor
 Katy Perry – singer and songwriter; English, German, Irish, and Portuguese ancestry
 Pink (Alecia Beth Moore) – singer, songwriter, dancer, and actress
 Jimmy Pop – musician, composer, comedian and lead singer of the Bloodhound Gang
 Elvis Presley – singer, songwriter, and actor
 Dee Dee Ramone – bassist for the Ramones
 Trent Reznor – musician, film score composer and founder of Nine Inch Nails
 Heinz Eric Roemheld – composer; won the Academy Award for Best Original Music Score for Yankee Doodle Dandy in 1943
 Linda Ronstadt – singer and songwriter
 Dieter Ruehle – stadium organist for Major League Baseball's Los Angeles Dodgers and National Hockey League's Los Angeles Kings.
 Nate Ruess – singer-songwriter and musician, best known as the lead vocalist of indie rock band Fun
 Felix Salten – composed scores for some 150 Hollywood movies
 Arnold Schoenberg – expressionist movement in German poetry and art, and leader of the Second Viennese School
 Wesley Schultz – guitarist and lead vocalist for the American folk rock band The Lumineers
 Pete Seeger – folk singer
 John Philip Sousa – composer and conductor of the late Romantic era, known particularly for American military and patriotic marches
 James Shaffer – co-founder and guitarist of the nu metal band Korn
 Paul Stanley – musician from the band KISS, of Jewish descent, his mother was born in Berlin
 Frederick Stock – composer and conductor with the Chicago Symphony Orchestra
 Mark Stoermer – musician, producer and singer-songwriter; bassist for alternative rock band the Killers
 Joel Stroetzel – guitarist from the metalcore band Killswitch Engage
 Taylor Swift – singer-songwriter
 Lil Peep († 2017) – rapper, singer and songwriter; mother was of German descent
 Machine Gun Kelly – rapper, singer and actor
 Theodore Thomas – conductor
 Obie Trice – rapper
 Steven Tyler – lead singer of Aerosmith
 Eddie Vedder – lead vocalist of Pearl Jam
 Kurt Weill – composer
 Lawrence Welk – bandleader
 Pete Wentz – bassist for Fall Out Boy
 Hans Zimmer – Academy Award-winning film composer, German immigrant
 Wolfgang Zuckermann – harpsichord maker and writer

Directors, producers, screenwriters, and film editors
 Michael Ballhaus – Cinematographer 
 Gesine Bullock-Prado – pastry chef, TV personality, author, attorney, and former film executive
 Frank Dexter (1882–1965) – German-born American art director
 Roy O. Disney – entertainment industry executive
 Roland Emmerich – Hollywood film director; born in Stuttgart
 Paul Feig – actor and director, of Jewish descent; parents converted to Christian Science
 Steven Fischer – producer and director; two-time Primetime Emmy Award nominee
 Ray Harryhausen – visual effects creator, writer, and producer
 Carl Laemmle – pioneer in American filmmaking and a founder of one of the original major Hollywood movie studios, of Jewish descent
 Ernst Lubitsch – acclaimed film director, special Academy Award winner
 Anthony Mann – film director and actor
 Richard C. Meyer – German-American television and film editor
 Russ Meyer – director and photographer
 F. W. Murnau – film director of the silent era
 Seymour Nebenzahl – film producer, of Jewish descent
 Kurt Neumann – Hollywood film director who specialized in science fiction
 Mike Nichols – Academy Award-winning film director, writer and producer
 Arch Oboler – scriptwriter, novelist, producer and director who was active in films, radio and television
 Wolfgang Petersen – director
 Wally Pfister – Academy Award-nominated American cinematographer
 Kelly Reichardt – screenwriter and film director working within American indie cinema
 Gottfried Reinhardt – producer and director
 Ringling brothers – circus owners
 Victor Schertzinger – composer, film director, film producer, and screenwriter
 Eugen Schüfftan – cinematographer and inventor
 Nev Schulman – producer, actor, and photographer
 Reinhold Schünzel – director and actor
 Robert Siodmak – director
 Wim Wenders – film director
 William Wyler – film director
 Florenz Ziegfeld Jr. – Broadway impresario, notable for his series of theatrical revues, the Ziegfeld Follies

Humorists
 Michael Ian Black (born Michael Ian Schwartz) – comedian, actor, writer, and director
 David Letterman – late-night talk show host and comedian and the host of CBS's Late Show with David Letterman
 Daniel Tosh – comedian, host of Comedy Central's Tosh.0

Models
 Wilhelmina Cooper – model who began with Ford Models, and at the peak of her success, founded her own agency, Wilhelmina Models
 Cindy Crawford – model
 Rande Gerber – male model and entrepreneur
 Karlie Kloss – fashion model and entrepreneur
 Heidi Klum – model
 Nicole Brown Simpson – model
 Nena von Schlebrügge – former fashion model in the 1950s and 1960s; of German and Swedish descent; mother of actress Uma Thurman

First Ladies of the United States
(in order by their husband's presidency)
 Lucretia Garfield
 Florence Harding
 Pat Nixon

Historical figures

 Buzz Aldrin – astronaut, first human to speak on the Moon
 Harry J. Anslinger – United States government official who served as the first commissioner of the United States Department of the Treasury's Federal Bureau of Narcotics, supporter of prohibition and the criminalization of drugs, and played a pivotal role in cannabis prohibition
 Neil Armstrong – astronaut, first human to set foot on the Moon
 George Atzerodt – assassin, conspirator in the assassination of Abraham Lincoln
 Meta Schlichting Berger – socialist organizer
 Laura Bullion (1876–1961) – female Old West outlaw
 Warren E. Burger (1907–1995) – Chief Justice of the United States, 1969–1986
 Harold Hitz Burton – politician and lawyer, served as the 45th mayor of Cleveland, Ohio, as a U.S. senator from Ohio, and as an Associate Justice of the Supreme Court of the United States
 Willard Erastus Christianson aka Matt Warner – Old West outlaw, deputy sheriff
 John Dillinger – bank robber in the Depression
 Dr. Carl Adolph Douai – educational reformer, abolitionist, newspaper editor, and labor leader
 Amelia Earhart – aviation pioneer and author, the first woman to receive the Distinguished Flying Cross
 Johann Friedrich Ernst – "Father of German Immigration to Texas", arriving in 1831
 Bobby Fischer – chess prodigy, grandmaster, and the eleventh World Chess Champion
 Henry Francis Fisher – German Texan in Houston, Texas, where he was consul for the Hanseatic League, became acting treasurer of the San Saba Company
 Gerhard Gesell – United States federal judge
 Meyer Guggenheim (1828–1905) – statesman, patriarch of what became known as the Guggenheim family
 Frank Gusenburg – gangster and a victim of the Saint Valentine's Day massacre in Chicago
 Peter Gusenberg – member of Chicago's North Side Gang, the main rival to the Chicago Outfit
 Bruno Hauptmann – Lindbergh kidnapper
 Alfons Heck – writer and former Hitler Youth
 Friedrich Hecker – revolutionary
 Michael Hillegas – first Treasurer of the United States
 Alger Hiss – American government official accused in 1948 of having spied for the Soviet Union in the 1930s, original surname of "Hesse"
 Jimmy Hoffa – labor union leader and author
 J. Edgar Hoover – first Director of the Federal Bureau of Investigation (FBI)
 Lena Kleinschmidt – jewel thief
 Fritz Kuhn – German American Bund leader
 Maria Kraus-Boelté – pioneer of Fröbel education in the United States, and helped promote kindergarten training as suitable for study at university level
 Herman Lamm – considered the "father of modern bank robbery"
 Johann Lederer – explorer
 Jacob Leisler – colonist
 Frank J. Loesch – law enforcement official, reformer and a founder of the Chicago Crime Commission
 Kurt Frederick Ludwig – head of the "Joe K" spy ring in the United States in 1940–41
 Paul Machemehl – German-Texan, rancher and civic leader
 Fredericka Mandelbaum – entrepreneur and criminal
 Nicola Marschall – designer of the first national flag and uniform of the Confederacy
 Christene Mayer – aka "Kid Glove Rosey", famous thief and associate of "Black" Lena Kleinschmidt
 Benjamin Kurtz Miller – philanthropist
 Burchard Miller – Texas land pioneer
 Peter Minuit – Director-General of the Dutch colony of New Netherland
 Charles Mohr – pharmacist
 Pat Nixon – former First Lady of the United States
 Duncan Niederauer – CEO of the New York Stock Exchange (NYSE)
 Madge Oberholtzer – schoolteacher who worked for the state of Indiana on adult literacy
 Bonnie Parker – outlaw, robber, and criminal
 Franz Daniel Pastorius – pioneer and founder of Germantown, Pennsylvania
 Molly Pitcher (born Mary Ludwig) – American Revolutionary War hero
 Robert Prager – Illinois coal miner lynched during World War I because of anti-German sentiment
 Hermann Raster – Chicago politician, editor, and abolitionist
 Charles Reiser – safecracker
 William Addams Reitwiesner – genealogist who traced the ancestry of United States political figures, European royalty and celebrities
 Walter Reuther – labor leader
 Rockefeller family – industrial and political family that made one of the world's largest fortunes in the oil business during the late 19th and early 20th centuries
 Arthur M. Schlesinger Jr. – historian, social critic, and public intellectual
 August Schrader – engineer and mechanic
 Carl Schurz – politician, newspaper editor, Civil War general
 Norman Schwarzkopf Sr. – Lindbergh kidnapping investigator
 Dutch Schultz (born Arthur Flegenheimer) – New York City-area gangster
 Margarethe Schurz – established the kindergarten system in the United States
 Frank "The German" Schweihs – alleged hitman who had been known to work for The Outfit, the organized crime family in Chicago
 Prince Carl of Solms-Braunfels – "Texas-Carl" was an Austro-Hungarian Lieutenant General and founder of the town New Braunfels, Texas
 Jacob Sternberger – historian and one of the original Forty-Eighters
 Ida Straus – victim of the sinking of the RMS Titanic
 Isidor Straus – former co-owner of Macy's and victim of the sinking of the RMS Titanic
 Harry "Pittsburgh Phil" Strauss – prolific contract killer for Murder, Inc.
 Chesley Sullenberger – commercial airline pilot, safety expert, and accident investigator; piloted US Airways Flight 1549 to a safe ditching in the Hudson River in New York City
 John Sutter – settler/colonizer
 Jack Swigert – NASA astronaut, one of the 24 persons who have flown to the Moon
 Count Ludwig Joseph von Boos-Waldeck – German noble descended from a line of Rhenish Knights and nobles dating back to the 13th century, organized the Adelsverein, to promote German emigration to Texas
 Andrew Von Etter – Boston mobster
 Paul Warburg – banker
 Louis J. Weichmann – chief witnesses for the prosecution in the conspiracy trial of the assassination of Abraham Lincoln
 Conrad Weiser – pioneer, farmer, monk, tanner, judge, soldier, interpreter and diplomat between the Pennsylvania Colony and Native Americans
 Lewis Wetzel – frontiersman and Indian fighter
 Gus Winkler – St. Louis mobster
 Adam Worth – gentleman criminal
 Joe Wurzelbacher – employee of Newell Plumbing & Heating, "the most famous plumber in the nation", rose to national attention when he was mentioned by Republican United States Senator John McCain and Democratic Senator Barack Obama at least 23 times, during the third and final presidential debate on October 15, 2008
 John Peter Zenger – printer, publisher, editor and journalist in New York City
 David Ziegler – first mayor of Cincinnati; Revolutionary War Veteran and aide to president George Washington

Military 

 Rosemarie Aquilina – Judge, Michigan Army National Guardswoman, Michigan's first female member of the Judge Advocate General's Corps
 Otto Boehler – United States Army private awarded the Medal of Honor for actions during the Moro Rebellion during the Philippine–American War
 Johann August Heinrich Heros von Borcke – Major in the Confederate army
 George Armstrong Custer (1839–1876) – United States Army cavalry commander
 Thomas Custer – United States Army officer and two-time recipient of the Medal of Honor for bravery during the American Civil War; a younger brother of George Armstrong Custer, perishing with him at Little Bighorn in the Montana Territory
 Konrad Dannenberg – rocket pioneer and member of the German Rocket Team, brought to the U.S. under Operation Paperclip
 Dieter Dengler – German born United States Navy Naval aviator during the Vietnam War
 Hubert Dilger – decorated artillerist in the Union Army during the American Civil War
 Walter Dornberger – leader of Germany's V-2 rocket program and other projects at the Peenemünde Army Research Center, brought to the U.S. under Operation Paperclip
 Johann de Kalb – Major General in the American Revolution
 Frank Finkel – claimed to be the only white survivor of the Battle of Little Big Horn
 Alfred Maximilian Gruenther – senior United States Army officer, Red Cross president, and bridge player
 Thomas W. Hartmann – Brigadier General, lawyer and officer in the United States Air Force Reserve
 Friedrich Hecker – lawyer, politician, revolutionary and Civil War colonel
 Lewis Heermann – commissioned Surgeon's Mate in the United States Navy February 8, 1802; in 1942, the destroyer  was named in his honor
 Nicholas Herkimer – commanding general at Battle of Oriskany, American Revolutionary War
 Daniel Hiester – political and military leader from the Revolutionary War period to the early 19th century
 John Hiester – military leader from the Revolutionary War period to the early 19th century
 Ralph Ignatowski – soldier, of Polish descent, World War II veteran, best friend of John Bradley
 Herman Kahn – military strategist and systems theorist
 August Kautz – Brigadier General /Union Army officer
 Walter Krueger – United States Army general during World War II and military historian
 Eugene H. C. Leutze – Admiral of the United States Navy, appointed to the United States Naval Academy by President Abraham Lincoln in 1863
 Jerry M. Linenger – captain, Medical Corps, U.S. Navy and a former NASA astronaut
 Frank Luke MOH aviator World War I
 Aleda E. Lutz – American Army flight nurse during World War II, second-most decorated woman in American military history
 Marc Mitscher – Vice Admiral in the U.S. Navy; served as commander of the Fast Carrier Task Force in the Pacific in the latter half of World War II
 Peter Muhlenberg – clergyman, soldier and a politician of the Colonial, Revolutionary, and Post-Revolutionary eras in Pennsylvania
 Chester W. Nimitz – Commander in Chief of Pacific Forces for the United States and Allied forces during World War II
 Peter Osterhaus – Union Army general in the American Civil War, later serving as a U.S. diplomat
 John J. Pershing – officer in the United States Army, rose to the highest rank ever held in the U.S. Army – General of the Armies
 Molly Pitcher (Mary Ludwig Hays) – American Revolutionary soldier
 Friedrich Adolf Riedesel – regiment commander of the Duchy of Brunswick (Braunschweig) unit hired by the British during the American Revolution
 Edward S. Salomon – Union brigadier general in the American Civil War, of Jewish descent
 Frederick Salomon – Union brigadier general in the American Civil War
 Alexander Schimmelfennig – American Civil War general in the Union Army
 Harry Schmidt – U.S. Marine Corps general
 Tony F. Schneider – World War II pilot who served as Associate Professor of Naval Science at University of Louisville and as Professor of Naval Science at the University of New Mexico
 James Martinus Schoonmaker – Colonel in the Union Army in the American Civil War and a vice-president of the Pittsburgh and Lake Erie Railroad
 Harold G. Schrier – officer in the United States Marine Corps, recipient of the Navy Cross, the nation's second highest award for valor, and a combat veteran of World War II and the Korean War; one of the six Marines who raised the first American flag on Mount Suribachi, during the Battle of Iwo Jima on February 23, 1945
 Theodore Schwan – officer who served with distinction during the American Civil War, Spanish–American War and the Philippine–American War
 Norman Schwarzkopf Jr. – United States Army General
 Albert Sieber – U.S. Civil War veteran, Chief of Scouts for much of the Apache Wars and tracked Geronimo
 Franz Sigel – teacher, newspaperman, politician, and served as a Union general in the American Civil War
 Clem Sohn – airshow dare-devil in the 1930s; perfected a way of gliding through the air with a home-made wingsuit
 Carl Andrew Spaatz – general in World War II
 Adolph von Steinwehr – served as a Union general in the American Civil War
 Friedrich Wilhelm Ludolf Gerhard Augustin von Steuben – German–Prussian General; served with George Washington in the American Revolutionary War; credited with teaching the Continental Army the essentials of military drill and discipline
 Michael Strobl – retired United States Marine Corps officer
 Gustav Tafel – colonel in the Union Army during the American Civil War
 Stephen J. Townsend – U.S. Army general, served with the 10th Mountain Division during the war in Afghanistan; born in (West) Germany
 Max Weber – Brigadier General in the Union army during the American Civil War; settled in New York City and worked as proprietor of the Konstanz Hotel in New York
 Lewis Wetzel – frontiersman and Indian fighter who roamed the hills of western Virginia and Ohio; Wetzel County, West Virginia, is named for him
 Godfrey Weitzel – Major General in the Union army during the American Civil War
 August Willich – general in the Union Army during the American Civil War
 Charles Henry Wilcken – artilleryman who was awarded the Iron Cross by the King of Prussia, Frederick William IV
 Jurgen Wilson – Union Army officer during the American Civil War
 Frederick Charles Winkler – lieutenant colonel in the Union Army during the American Civil War who was nominated and confirmed for appointment to the grade of brevet brigadier general in 1866. He later became a member of the Wisconsin State Assembly
 Henry Wirz (born Heinrich Hartmann Wirz) – Confederate officer tried and executed in the aftermath of the American Civil War
 Elmo Zumwalt – Admiral and later the 19th Chief of Naval Operations in the U.S. Navy, playing a major part in the Vietnam War, the USS Zumwalt (DDG-1000), a guided missile destroyer was named in his honor

Philosophers
 Felix Adler – rationalist intellectual
 Hannah Arendt – political theorist
 Rudolf Carnap – philosopher
 Adolf Grünbaum – philosopher
 Francis Lieber – jurist/political philosopher
 Herbert Marcuse – philosopher (1898–1979)
 Nicholas Rescher – philosopher

Politicians

 Robert Aderholt – politician and attorney serving as the U.S. representative for Alabama's 4th congressional district, serving since 1997.
 John Peter Altgeld – former Union troop, Illinois governor and leading figure of the Progressive Era movement
 Edward L. Bader – politician who served as mayor of Atlantic City, New Jersey
 William B. Bader – Assistant Secretary of State for Educational and Cultural Affairs 1999–2001
 Gerhard Adolph Bading – physician, politician, and diplomat
 Charles Augustus Barnitz – Anti-Masonic member of the United States House of Representatives for Pennsylvania's 11th congressional district from 1833 to 1835
 Gary Bauer – politician
 Martin Baum – former Mayor of Cincinnati, fought with General Anthony Wayne at the Battle of Fallen Timbers
 Paul Bechtner – newspaper editor of Abendpost, manufacturer, and Wisconsin State Assembly politician
 Henry C. Berghoff – Mayor of Fort Wayne, Indiana, Cofounder of the Herman J. Berghoff Brewing Company, lawyer, and businessman
 John Boehner – Republican House Majority Leader in the 109th Congress, and a U.S. representative from Ohio's 8th congressional district
 John Bohn – politician who served as mayor of Milwaukee, Wisconsin, from 1942 to 1948
 William C. Bouck – Governor of the New York, 1843–1844
 Philip Becker – Mayor of Buffalo, New York, serving 1876–1877 and 1886–1889
 Sherburn M. Becker – politician and the 41st Mayor of Milwaukee
 Mike Braun – Businessman and politician serving as the junior United States senator from Indiana
 Martin Grove Brumbaugh – Pennsylvania's 25th Governor (Republican)
 Warren E. Burger – former Chief Justice of the United States
 Henry Burk – former Republican member of the United States House of Representatives from Pennsylvania
 George W. Bush – U.S. President (2001–2009)
 Earl Lauer Butz – Secretary of Agriculture under presidents Richard Nixon and Gerald Ford
 Hiester Clymer (1827–1884) U.S. Congressman from the Commonwealth of Pennsylvania
 Kent Conrad – U.S. Senator from North Dakota
 William Q. Dallmeyer – Missouri politician
 Thomas Dixon Jr. – politician, lawyer
 Tom Daschle – U.S. Senator from South Dakota, 1987–2005, former Senate Majority Leader
 William J. Diehl – served as Mayor of Pittsburgh, 1899–1901, a thirty-third degree mason
 George Anthony Dondero – U.S. Representative from Michigan
 Sean Duffy – U.S. representative for Wisconsin's 7th congressional district
 Gerhard Anton (Anthony) Eickhoff – journalist, editor, author, lawyer, United States Congress representative of New York City, United States Treasury auditor and New York City Fire Commissioner
 Dwight D. Eisenhower – five-star Army general and U.S. president
 Jesse E. Eschbach – judge of the United States District Court for the Northern District of Indiana and a judge of the United States Court of Appeals for the Seventh Circuit
 Jonathan Fritz – politician who has served in the Pennsylvania House of Representatives from the 111th district
 Tulsi Gabbard – U.S. Congresswoman from Hawaii's 2nd Congressional District
 Timothy Geithner – U.S. Secretary of the Treasury
 Dick Gephardt – U.S. Congressman, 1977–2005
 James Lawrence Getz – member of the United States House of Representatives from Pennsylvania
 William Goebel – controversial politician who served as Governor of Kentucky for a few days in 1900 before being assassinated
 Richard W. Guenther – 19th-century politician and pharmacist from Wisconsin
 Charles Godfrey Gunther – Mayor of New York, 1864–1866
 Paul Grottkau – socialist political activist and newspaper publisher
 Chuck Hagel – U.S. Senator and Secretary of Defense
 Louis F. Haffen – two-time Bronx, New York Borough President, 1898–1909
 John Paul Hammerschmidt – served for 13 terms in the United States House of Representatives from Arkansas
 William Havemeyer – served three times as the Mayor of New York City (1845–1846, 1848–1849, and 1873–1874)
 Max W. Heck – politician and jurist
 Julius Heil – Governor of Wisconsin, 1939–1943
 H. Robert Heller – Governor, Federal Reserve System, 1986–1989 and President of VISA U.S.A.
 Daniel Hiester (1747–1804) US Congressman
 Gabriel Hiester (1749–1824) Pennsylvania political leader
 Isaac Ellmaker Hiester (1824–1871) US Congressman
 John Hiester (1745–1821) US Congressman
 Joseph Hiester (1752–1832) US Congressman and Governor of Pennsylvania
 Daniel Hiester the younger (1774–1834) US Congressman
 William Hiester (1790–1853) US Congressman
 William Muhlenberg Hiester – (1818–1878) political and military leader in the Commonwealth of Pennsylvania
 H. John Heinz III – member of the United States House of Representatives from Pennsylvania (1971–1977) and the United States Senate (1977–1991) and son of H. J. Heinz II (heir to the H. J. Heinz Company)
 Gustav A. Hoff (1852–1930) – German-born American politician and businessman active in Arizona Territory
 Herbert Hoover – U.S. President
 Franz Hübschmann – prominent physician and political leader in Milwaukee, Wisconsin
 Arthur W. Hummel Jr. – U.S. ambassador
 Don Hummel – businessman and politician
 Darrell Issa – businessman and U.S. Representative from California
 Philip Mayer Kaiser – former U.S. diplomat
 Vera Katz – 45th mayor of Portland, Oregon
 Steve King – U.S. Representative
 Charles Frederick Kirschler – former mayor of Allegheny City, Pennsylvania, which included Deutschtown, annexed by Pittsburgh
 Henry Kissinger – former Secretary of State, of Jewish-German descent
 John C. Koch – Republican politician who served two terms as mayor of Milwaukee, Wisconsin
 Matt Koehl leader of the American Nazi Party, which in 1983, influenced by esoteric Nazism, he renamed as the New Order
 Gustav Koerner – Lieutenant Governor of Illinois, 1853–1857, U.S. ambassador to Spain, and one of the original Dreissiger
 Ferdinand Kuehn – Milwaukee politician
 Louis Kuehnle – politician; considered a pioneer in the growing resort town of Atlantic City in the late 1880s
 John Christian Kunkel – former Whig and Republican member of the United States House of Representatives from Pennsylvania
 Tom Loeffler – former Republican member of the United States House of Representatives from central Texas
 Richard Lugar – U.S. Senator from Indiana
 Judy Martz – 22nd Governor of Montana
 Oscar Marx – mayor of Detroit from 1913 to 1918
 Christopher Gustavus Memminger – first Confederate States Secretary of the Treasury, 1861–1864
 Baron Otfried Hans von Meusebach – Prussian bureaucrat, later an American farmer, politician, and member of the Texas Senate
 Frederick Muhlenberg – minister and politician who was the first Speaker of the United States House of Representatives
 Peter Muhlenberg – clergyman, a soldier and a politician of the Colonial, Revolutionary, and Post-Revolutionary eras in Pennsylvania
 Karl E. Mundt – U.S. Senator and Congressman
 Paul Henry Nitze – Presidential Medal of Freedom recipient
 Richard Nixon – U.S. president; of English, Irish and German ancestries
 Barack Obama – U.S. president; mother, Ann Dunham, has German ancestors who arrived in America in 1750
 Sarah Palin – former Governor of Alaska; Republican nominee for vice president in 2008; both parents are of partial German ancestry
 Ron Paul – former U.S. Congressman from Texas
 Henry Paulson – U.S. Secretary of the Treasury
 Tim Pawlenty – former Governor of Minnesota; mother was of German descent
 Horace Porter – decorated Union soldier and diplomat; son of David Rittenhouse Porter, a wealthy ironmaster who later served as Governor of Pennsylvania
 Reince Priebus – chairman of the Republican National Committee and also a previous chair of the Republican Party of Wisconsin
 William C. Rauschenberger – Republican politician who served as mayor of Milwaukee, Wisconsin
 Luke Ravenstahl – Pittsburgh mayor
 Denny Rehberg – Lieutenant governor of Montana, 1991–1997 and U.S. representative for Montana's at-large congressional district, 2001–2013
 Jim Risch – former Governor of Idaho
 Joseph Ritner – eighth Governor of the commonwealth of Pennsylvania, elected as a member of the Anti-Masonic Party
 Nelson Rockefeller – Governor of New York and forty-first Vice President of the United States
 Winthrop Rockefeller – politician and philanthropist who served as the first Republican Governor of Arkansas since Reconstruction
 William E. Rodriguez (1879–1970) – socialist politician and lawyer; first Hispanic elected to the Chicago City Council; of Spanish and German descent
 Brian Roehrkasse – spokesman at the United States Justice Department under the administration of George W. Bush
 Dana Rohrabacher – Republican member of the United States House of Representatives since 1989, currently representing California's 46th congressional district
 Mitt Romney – politician, businessman and former presidential candidate who has served as the junior United States senator from Utah since January 2019. He previously served as the 70th governor of Massachusetts from 2003 to 2007 and was the Republican Party's nominee for president of the United States in the 2012 election.
 Theodore Roosevelt – U.S. President
 John Hoover Rothermel – member of the United States House of Representatives from Pennsylvania
 Donald Rumsfeld – former Secretary of Defense
 Paul Ryan – former Speaker of the United States House of Representatives from Wisconsin
 Edward Salomon – Governor of Wisconsin during the Civil War
 Edward S. Salomon – Union brigadier general in the Civil War, later became governor of Washington Territory and a California legislator
 George E. Sangmeister – Senator and Congressman from Illinois; served in various elected public offices, 1972–1994
 Harry Sauthoff – lawyer, Wisconsin State Senator, also served in the United States House of Representatives
 Gustav Schleicher – U.S. Representative from Texas, serving briefly in Texas legislature and veteran of the Confederate Army
 Solomon Scheu – mayor of Buffalo, New York, in office 1878–1880
 Steve Schmidt – campaign strategist
 Gustav A. Schneebeli – former United States Representative from the state of Pennsylvania
 Frederick A. Schroeder – industrialist and politician
 Terry Schrunk – politician who served as the mayor for the city of Portland, Oregon, 1957–1973
 Mark S. Schweiker – 44th Governor of the Pennsylvania
 Richard Schultz Schweiker – former U.S. Congressman and Senator representing the state of Pennsylvania, later the Secretary of Health and Human Services in the Cabinet of President Ronald Reagan
 Carl Schurz – statesman and reformer, and Union Army general in the American Civil War
 Sargent Shriver – diplomat, politician and activist, as the husband of Eunice Kennedy Shriver, he was part of the Kennedy family
 John Andrew Shulze – Pennsylvania political leader and 6th Governor of Pennsylvania, a member of the Muhlenberg family political dynasty
 Emil Seidel – Mayor of Milwaukee, 1910–1912; the first Socialist mayor of a major city in the United States, and ran as the vice presidential candidate for the Socialist Party of America in the 1912 presidential election
 August Siemering – writer, political leader and Forty-Eighter
 Al Smith – Governor of New York
 Jackie Speier – U.S. Representative, California's 12th and 14th districts, serving since 2008; father was a German immigrant
 Harold Edward Stassen was the 25th Governor of Minnesota, 1939–1943
 Richard Fred Suhrheinrich – judge of the United States Court of Appeals for the Sixth Circuit
 Brian Schweitzer – served as the 23rd Governor of Montana
 Strom Thurmond – U.S. Senator
 Donald Trump – 45th President of the United States
 Jesse Ventura – former Governor of Minnesota (1999–2003), his mother is of Hungarian-German descent
 Ferdinand E. Volz – Mayor of Pittsburgh, 1854–1856
 Robert F. Wagner – U.S. Senator from New York, 1927–1949
 Emil Wallber – mayor of Milwaukee from 1884 to 1888, during the Great Labor Strike of 1886
 Lowell P. Weicker Jr. – politician who has served as a U.S. Representative, U.S. Senator, and Governor of Connecticut
 Wendell Willkie – lawyer and the Republican nominee for the 1940 presidential election
 Carl Zeidler – mayor of Milwaukee, Wisconsin, from 1940 to 1942
 Frank Zeidler – mayor of Milwaukee, Wisconsin, serving three terms from April 20, 1948, to April 18, 1960
 Robert Zoellick – eleventh president of the World Bank, former United States Deputy Secretary of state and United States Trade Representative

Religious
 Joseph Breuer – leader of the Orthodox Jewish community of Washington Heights, Manhattan; very well known for his involvement in setting up an Orthodox Jewish infrastructure in post-World War II America
 Conrad Beissel – religious leader who in 1732 founded the Ephrata Community in Pennsylvania
 Raymond Philip Etteldorf – Roman Catholic Archbishop and author
 George J. Geis – Baptist missionary in Kachin State, Burma
 Eugene John Gerber – prelate of the Roman Catholic Church. He served as Bishop of Dodge City from 1976 to 1982, and Bishop of Wichita from 1982 to 2001.
 Robert Graetz – Lutheran clergyman
 Stanley Hauerwas – theologian, ethicist, and public intellectual
 Barbara Heck – 1768 – founder of the first Methodist church in New York
 Joseph J. Himmel – Catholic priest and member of the Society of Jesus. For much of his early life, he was a missionary throughout the northeast United States and retreat master. Later in life, he was president of Gonzaga College and Georgetown University in Washington, D.C.
 Samuel Hirsch – philosopher and rabbi
 Arthur W. Hummel Sr. – Christian missionary to China and Sinologist
 Johannes Kelpius – pietist, mystic, musician, and writer, interested in the occult, botany, and astronomy, came to believe with his followers in the "Society of the Woman in the Wilderness"
 Kathryn Kuhlman – 20th-century faith healer and Pentecostal arm of Protestant Christianity
 Benjamin Kurtz – Lutheran pastor and theologian
 Barbara Heinemann Landmann – spiritual leader of the Amana Colonies
 Alexander Mack – Germantown, Pennsylvania New World religious leader
 Christian Metz – inspirationalist
 Albert Gregory Meyer – Roman Catholic Archbishop of Chicago
 Henry K. Moeller – Roman Catholic Archbishop of Cincinnati
 John Gottlieb Morris – Lutheran minister who played an influential role in the evolution of the Lutheran church in America.
 Heinrich Melchior Muhlenberg – Lutheran clergyman
 Richard John Neuhaus – clergyman (first a Lutheran pastor and then a Roman Catholic priest), theologian, and ethicist
 St. John Neumann – Bishop of Philadelphia (1852–60) and the first American bishop to be canonized
 Reinhold Niebuhr – Protestant theologian best known for his work relating the Christian faith to the realities of modern politics and diplomacy
 William Passavant – Lutheran minister noted for bringing the Lutheran Deaconess movement to the United States
 George Rapp – founder of the religious sect called Harmonists, Harmonites, Rappites, or the Harmony Society
 Augustus Rauschenbusch – clergyman
 Walter Rauschenbusch – theologian and Baptist pastor who taught at the Rochester Theological Seminary
 Joseph Cardinal Ritter – Roman Catholic Archbishop and Cardinal of the Church, desegregated schools in his two archdioceses in the mid-1940s
 George Erik Rupp – educator and theologian, the former President of Rice University and later of Columbia University, and president of the International Rescue Committee
 Theodore Emanuel Schmauk – Lutheran minister, educator, author and Church theologian, one of the organizers of the Pennsylvania Dutch Society (1891)
 Theodore Schneider – second bishop of the Metropolitan Washington, D.C., synod of the Evangelical Lutheran Church in America
 Francis Xavier Seelos – Roman Catholic missionary priest beatified in 2000
 Joseph Strub – founder of what is today Duquesne University, which was called the Pittsburgh Catholic College of the Holy Ghost until 1911
 Billy Sunday – evangelist
 Paul Tillich – Protestant theologian and Christian existentialist philosopher
 C. F. W. Walther – Lutheran clergyman, professor, seminary president, editor, and first president of the Lutheran Church–Missouri Synod
 Donald Wuerl – prelate of the Roman Catholic Church
 Count Nicholas Ludwig von Zinzendorf – founded the town of Bethlehem, Pennsylvania, where his daughter Benigna organized the school that would become Moravian College
 Dieter F. Uchtdorf – apostle and current second counselor in the First Presidency within the Church of Jesus Christ of Latter-day Saints; born in the Czech Republic to German parents, Uchtdorf immigrated to the United States as a retired pilot to serve full-time as a general authority for his Church and became an American citizen shortly after joining the First Presidency in 2008

Scientists and inventors

 David Alter – inventor, physicist and doctor
 Reinhold Aman – chemical engineer and publisher of Maledicta
 Othmar Ammann – civil engineer
 Rudolf Arnheim – author, art and film theorist, and perceptual psychologist; learned Gestalt psychology from studying under Max Wertheimer and Wolfgang Köhler at the University of Berlin and applied it to art
 Walter Baade – astronomer
 Earl W. Bascom – inventor of rodeo equipment
 Max Bentele – pioneer in the field of jet aircraft turbines and mechanical engineering
 Hans Albrecht Bethe – nuclear physicist who won a Nobel Prize in physics for his work on the nuclear energy sources of stars (1967)
 Franz Boas – anthropologist and ethnologist best known for his work with the Kwakiutl Indians in British Columbia, Canada
 Karl Brandt – economist
 Magnus von Braun – chemical engineer, Luftwaffe aviator, and rocket scientist at Peenemünde, the Mittelwerk, and after emigrating to the United States via Operation Paperclip, at Fort Bliss; brother of Wernher von Braun
 Wernher von Braun – rocket scientist, aerospace engineer, space architect
 Florian Cajori – mathematician
 Hermann Collitz – eminent German historical linguist and Indo-Europeanist
 Werner Dahm – NASA rocket scientist
 Hans Georg Dehmelt – physicist
 Max Delbrück – biophysicist
 Krafft Arnold Ehricke – rocket-propulsion engineer
 Ernst R. G. Eckert – scientist
 Otto Eckstein – economist
 Albert Einstein – theoretical physicist, philosopher and author of Jewish ethnicity
 George Engelmann – botanist
 Katherine Esau – botanist
 Edmond H. Fischer – biochemist
 James Franck – physicist
 John Fritz – pioneer of iron and steel technology who has been referred to as the "Father of the U.S. Steel Industry"
 Frieda Fromm-Reichmann – psychoanalyst, founded William Alanson White Institute
 Ernst Geissler – NASA aerospace engineer
 William Paul Gerhard – sanitary engineer
 William H. Gerstenmaier – senior NASA official who served as NASA's Associate Administrator for Human Exploration and Operations
 Ivan A. Getting – physicist and electrical engineer, credited (along with Roger L. Easton and Bradford Parkinson) with the development of the Global Positioning System (GPS)
 Edward Glaeser – economist and Fred and Eleanor Glimp Professor of Economics at Harvard University
 Heinrich Göbel – precision mechanic and inventor, who was long seen as an early pioneer who independently developed designs for an incandescent light bulb, though this claim is seen as unlikely today
 Maria Goeppert Mayer – Nobel Prize-winning physicist
 John P. Grotzinger – Fletcher Jones Professor of Geology at California Institute of Technology under the Division of Geological and Planetary Sciences
 Martin Gruebele – biophysicist and Computational biologist, currently associated with many departments at University of Illinois at Urbana–Champaign
 Dietrich Gruen – timepiece or wristwatch maker; founded the Gruen Watch Company in Ohio
 Helmut Gröttrup – rocket scientist
 Hans Ulrich Gumbrecht – literary theorist and professor at Stanford University
 Walter Haeussermann – NASA rocket scientist
 Ewald Heer – aerospace engineer
 Michael Heidelberger – regarded as the father of modern immunology
 Holger Henke – political scientist
 Herman Hollerith – inventor of tabulating machines
 Karen Horney – psychoanalyst
 Edmund C. Jaeger – naturalist
 Donald J. Kessler – astrophysicist
 Siegfried Knemeyer – aviation technologist, civilian employee and consultant with the United States Air Force for over twenty years
 Donald Knuth – computer scientist, known as "The Yoda of Silicon Valley"
 Wolfgang Köhler – psychologist
 Heinrich Klüver – psychologist, largely credited with introducing Gestalt psychology to the United States in the early 20th century
 Alfred Louis Kroeber – cultural anthropologist
 Polykarp Kusch – physicist
 Berthold Laufer – anthropologist, historical geographer
 Willy Ley – science writer and space advocate who helped popularise rocketry and spaceflight
 Jacques Loeb – biologist, Nobel Prize candidate
 Leo Loeb – biologist, pathologist
 Ottmar Mergenthaler – linotype inventor
 Hugo Münsterberg – psychologist, pioneered applied psychology
 Emmy Noether – mathematician
 Robert Oppenheimer – physicist and director of the Manhattan Project, also known as "The Father of the Atomic Bomb"
 Robert F. Overmyer – test pilot and USAF and NASA astronaut
 Linus Carl Pauling – chemist, biochemist, chemical engineer, peace activist, author, and educator
 Jesco von Puttkamer – aerospace engineer, senior manager at NASA, and a pulp science fiction writer
 Charles Francis Richter – seismologist, inventor of the Richter magnitude scale
 David Rittenhouse – astronomer, inventor, mathematician, surveyor, scientific instrument craftsman, public official and first director of the United States Mint
 Eileen Rockefeller Growald – founder and former president of the Institute for the Advancement of Health
 Gunther E. Rothenberg – military historian, professor at Purdue University and elsewhere, of Jewish descent
 Otto Schaden – Egyptologist
 Vincent Schaefer – chemist and meteorologist who developed cloud seeding
 Hermann Irving Schlesinger – inorganic chemist, working in boron chemistry, co-discovered sodium borohydride in 1940
 Frank Schlesinger – astronomer
 Alfred Schütz – philosopher/sociologist
 Rusty Schweickart – astronaut
 Lewis David de Schweinitz – botanist and mycologist, "Father of American Mycology"
 Frederick Seitz – physicist, co-inventor of the Wigner-Seitz unit cell, which is an important concept in solid state physics
 Herbert A. Simon – political scientist
 Lyman Spitzer – theoretical physicist, astronomer and mountaineer
 Charles Proteus Steinmetz – electrical engineer, fostered development of alternating current
 Adam Steltzner – NASA engineer who works for the Jet Propulsion Laboratory (JPL), flight projects including Galileo, Cassini, Mars Pathfinder, Mars Exploration Rovers
 Joseph Strauss – structural engineer and designer, chief engineer of the Golden Gate Bridge
 Otto Stern – physicist and Nobel laureate, known for his studies of molecular beams
 Frederick Traugott Pursh – botanist
 George Waldbott – physician, allergy and fluoride specialist
 David Wechsler – psychologist
 Hellmuth Walter – engineer who pioneered research into rocket engines and gas turbines
 Victor Frederick Weisskopf – World War II physicist of German-Jew ethnicity<r, working at Los Alamos on the Manhattan Project to develop the atomic bomb, and later campaigned against the proliferation of nuclear weapons; medal received in 1979
 Günter Wendt – mechanical engineer noted for his work in the U.S. human spaceflight program
 Gustave Whitehead – aviation pioneer, built first motorized plane
 Gerould Wilhelm – botanist and lichenologist who developed the Floristic Quality Assessment system for analyzing plant communities in the United States and Canada.
 Eckard Wimmer – virologist, Distinguished Professor of molecular genetics and microbiology at Stony Brook University; known for the first chemical synthesis of a viral genome capable of infection and subsequent production of live viruses
 Louis Wirth – sociologist
 Caspar Wistar – physician and anatomist
 Albert Wohlstetter – nuclear scientist
 Hans Zinsser – American bacteriologist, physician and author.
 Max August Zorn – algebraist, group theorist, and numerical analyst

Sports

Baseball professionals

 Chris von der Ahe – owner of the St. Louis Brown Stockings of the American Association, now the St. Louis Cardinals
 Nick Altrock – professional baseball player and coach
 Trevor Bauer – MLB pitcher
 Chris Beck – Chicago White Sox pitcher
 Heinz Becker – MLB first baseman who played for the Chicago Cubs (1943, 1945–46) and Cleveland Indians (1946–47)
 Zinn Beck – MLB third baseman, shortstop and first baseman; minor league manager and baseball scout
 Heinie Beckendorf – former MLB catcher
 Joe Benz – former pitcher for the Chicago White Sox; threw a no-hitter
 Lou Bierbauer – former MLB second baseman during the late 1880s and 1890s; credited with giving the Pittsburgh Pirates their name
 Mike Blowers – former MLB third baseman and first baseman; current Seattle Mariners radio commentator
 Brennan Boesch – MLBoutfielder
 Ted Breitenstein – former MLB pitcher and part of the "Pretzel Battery" with Heinie Peitz
 Clay Buchholz – MLB pitcher for the Boston Red Sox
 Taylor Buchholz – MLB pitcher
 Mark Buehrle – MLB pitcher
 Fritz Buelow – former MLB
 Jay Buhner – former MLB player
 Madison Bumgarner – MLB pitcher for the San Francisco Giants
 Roger Clemens – former MLB pitcher
 Bill Dahlen – former MLB shortstop
 Babe Danzig – MLB first baseman
 Ross Detwiler – MLB pitcher
 Mel Deutsch – former MLB pitcher
 Bill Dietrich – MLB pitcher
 Derek Dietrich – MLB 2nd baseman
 Barney Dreyfuss – baseball executive
 Ryne Duren – former relief pitcher in MLB
 Justin Duchscherer – MLB pitcher
 David Eckstein – MLB player and 2006 World Series MVP
 Mose Eggert – second baseman in Major League Baseball
 Hack Eibel – utility player in Major League Baseball
 Jim Eisenreich – former MLB outfielder
 Kid Elberfeld – "The Tabasco Kid", former shortstop in MLB
 Jacoby Ellsbury – center fielder
 Joe Engel – former left-handed pitcher and scout in MLB who spent nearly his entire career with the Washington Senators
 Oscar Emil "Happy" Felsch – center fielder for the Chicago White Sox, best known for his involvement in the 1919 Black Sox Scandal
 David Freese – 2011 National League Championship Series MVP Award and the 2011 World Series MVP Award winner
 Frank Frisch – former MLB player and manager
 Bruce Froemming – MLB umpire, then special assistant to the vice president on umpiring
 Gene Garber – former MLB player
 Ron Gardenhire – former New York Mets player and current Minnesota Twins manager
 Lou Gehrig – MLB player
 Charlie Gehringer – MLB second baseman, played 19 seasons (1924–1942) for the Detroit Tigers
 Charlie "Pretzels" Getzien – former MLB pitcher
 Troy Glaus – former MLB third baseman
 Paul Goldschmidt – MLB first baseman
 Zack Greinke – MLB pitcher
 Charlie Grimm – former MLB player
 Justin Grimm – MLB relief pitcher
 Heinie Groh – third baseman for the Cincinnati Reds and New York Giants
 Travis Hafner – Cleveland Indians designated hitter
 Noodles Hahn – former MLB pitcher
 Ian Happ – second baseman for the Chicago Cubs
 Roy Hartzell – MLB player 1906–1916
 Arnold Hauser – former MLB shortstop
 Harry Heilmann – Hall of Fame MLB player and World War I Veteran
 Fred Heimach – former MLB pitcher and part of the "Murderers' Row" Yankee teams
 Tommy Henrich – MLB player nicknamed "The Clutch" and "Old Reliable"
 Tom Herr – former MLB second baseman
 August Herrmann – MLB executive
 Orel Hershiser – former MLB pitcher
 Buck Herzog – MLB infielder and manager
 Whitey Herzog – MLB outfielder, scout, coach, manager, general manager and farm system director
 Shea Hillenbrand – baseball player
 Dick Hoblitzel – MLB first baseman
 Billy Hoeft – former MLB pitcher
 Barbara Hoffman – All-American Girls Professional Baseball League player
 Glenn Hubbard – former Atlanta Braves and Oakland Athletics player and current Braves' coach
 Carl Hubbell – MLB Hall of Fame screwball pitcher
 John Hummel – former MLB utility player
 Brock Huntzinger – MLB free agent
 Jason Isringhausen – MLB relief pitcher
 Edwin Jackson – MLB pitcher
 Derek Jeter – former MLB shortstop, played 20 season
 Jeff Karstens – MLB pitcher
 Pop Kelchner – college professor who spoke seven languages; prolific MLB scout
 Alex Kellner – MLB pitcher
 Walt Kellner – MLB pitcher
 Dean Kiekhefer – MLB relief pitcher
 Chuck Klein – former MLB outfielder
 Johnny Kling – former MLB catcher
 Bob Knepper – former MLB all-star pitcher
 Chuck Knoblauch – former MLB second baseman
 Mark Koenig – former MLB shortstop for the New York Yankees, 1925–1936
 Howie Koplitz – baseball player, pitcher for the 1961 Tigers and then the Senators until 1966
 Rick Kranitz – MLB pitching coach
 Gene Krapp – MLB pitcher
 Erik Kratz – MLB catcher
 Harvey Kuenn – player, coach and manager in MLB
 Randy Keisler – former MLB pitcher
 Dallas Keuchel – MLB pitcher
 Bowie Kuhn – former commissioner of MLB
 Kenesaw Mountain Landis – while serving as a Federal judge, Landis, an ardent baseball fan, was selected as chairman of a new National Commission of baseball
 Charley Lau – American League catcher and hitting coach, authored How to Hit .300
 Charlie Leibrandt – former MLB pitcher
 Craig Lefferts – former MLB pitcher
 Jon Lieber – MLB pitcher
 Jesse Litsch – MLB pitcher
 Hans Lobert – infielder, coach, manager and scout in MLB
 Kyle Lohse – MLB pitcher
 Chuck Machemehl – former Cleveland Indians pitcher
 Heinie Manush – Hall of Fame left-fielder in MLB
 Nick Markakis – outfielder for the Baltimore Orioles
 Erskine Mayer – MLB pitcher
 Heinie Meine – sometimes "Heinie" Meine, professional baseball player
 Fred Merkle – first baseman in Major League Baseball, 1907–1926
 Bob Meusel – former MLB shortstop
 Emil Meusel – former MLB outfielder
 Bill Mueller – retired MLB third baseman
 Freddie Muller – infielder in Major League Baseball
 Les Mueller – former MLB pitcher
 Walter Mueller – former professional baseball player who played outfield in MLB 1922–1926
 Fritz Mollwitz – born in Germany, former Major League Baseball first baseman
 Chris Nabholz – former starting pitcher in MLB
 Jeff Niemann – pitcher for the Tampa Bay Rays
 Brett Oberholtzer – MLB pitcher
 Ross Ohlendorf – MLB pitcher
 Daniel Ortmeier – MLB pitcher
 Fritz Ostermueller – pitcher in MLB 1934–1948
 Barney Pelty – MLB pitcher
 Heinie Peitz – former MLB catcher and part of the "Pretzel Battery" with Ted Breitenstein
 Dick Radatz – "The Monster" or "Moose", relief pitcher in MLB
 Rick Reuschel – former MLB pitcher
 Rick Rhoden – former Pittsburgh Pirate pitcher and current golf professional
 John Rocker – former MLB reliever and controversial figure
 Oscar Roettger – first baseman and right-handed pitcher in Major League Baseball
 Wally Roettger – outfielder in Major League Baseball
 Trevor Rosenthal – MLB Pitcher
 Babe Ruth – MLB player 1914–1935
 Adley Rutschman – catcher for the Oregon State Beavers, seen as a top prospect for the 2019 MLB Draft
 Germany Schaefer – former second baseman in MLB who played fifteen seasons
 Jordan Schafer – MLB player
 Ray Schalk – MLB catcher
 Bobby Shantz – MLB pitcher
 Scott Schebler – outfielder in the Los Angeles Dodgers organization
 Bob Scheffing – baseball player, coach, manager and front-office executive
 Carl Scheib – right-handed pitcher for the Philadelphia Athletics and St. Louis Cardinals of Major League Baseball
 Max Scherzer – MLB pitcher
 Curt Schilling – MLB pitcher
 Ryan Schimpf – former LSU Tigers baseball and MLB infielder
 Gus Schmelz – MLB manager
 Jason Schmidt – MLB baseball pitcher
 Mike Schmidt – former Philadelphia Phillies third baseman and Hall of Famer
 Frank Schneiberg – pitcher in Major League Baseball
 Brian Schneider – MLB catcher
 Red Schoendienst – former player, coach and manager in MLB
 Scott Schoeneweis – MLB relief pitcher
 Marge Schott – managing general partner, president and CEO of Major League Baseball's Cincinnati Reds franchise, 1984–1999
 Paul Schrieber – MLB umpire
 Al Schroll – MLB baseball pitcher
 Heinie Schuble – former MLB infielder
 John Schuerholz – general manager of the Atlanta Braves
 Frank Schulte – right fielder in Major League Baseball
 Joe Schultz – catcher, coach and manager in MLB
 Joe Schultz Sr. – Joe "Germany" Schultz, outfielder and farm system director in MLB and a manager in minor league baseball
 Skip Schumaker – outfielder for the St. Louis Cardinals
 Ralph Schwamb – St. Louis Browns pitcher and convicted murderer
 Kyle Schwarber – MLB catcher
 Bob Shawkey – baseball pitcher who played fifteen seasons in Major League Baseball
 J. B. Shuck – outfielder for the Chicago White Sox
 John Smoltz – pitcher for the Atlanta Braves
 Travis Snider – outfielder in MLB
 Warren Spahn – Hall of Fame pitcher in MLB
 Justin Speier – relief pitcher
 Rusty Staub – MLB player for 23 seasons (1963–1985)
 Terry Steinbach – former catcher in MLB
 Hank Steinbrenner – art-owner and Senior Vice President of the New York Yankees, along with his brother Hal Steinbrenner
 Harry Steinfeldt – MLB utility infielder
 Casey Stengel – MLB player and manager, early 1910s–1960s
 Stephen Strasburg – MLB pitcher
 Gus Suhr – Major League Baseball first baseman
 Bruce Sutter – Hall of Fame right-handed relief pitcher in MLB
 Nick Swisher – infielder in MLB
 Duke Snider – Hall of Fame MLB center fielder
 Jake Thielman – MLB pitcher
 Jack Thoney – reserve outfielder / infielder in Major League Baseball who played from 1902 through 1911
 Peter Ueberroth – executive, served as commissioner of MLB, 1984–1989
 Bob Uecker – former MLB player and award-winning sportscaster, comedian, and actor
 Jim Umbricht – former MLB pitcher
 Frank Viola – former starting pitcher in MLB
 Chris von der Ahe – entrepreneur and owner of the St. Louis Browns of the National League, now known as the Cardinals
 Fritz Von Kolnitz – MLB third baseman
 Doug Waechter – MLB pitcher, currently a free agent
 Billy Wagner – MLB closer
 Heinie Wagner – former MLB shortstop for the New York Giants and the Boston Red Sox
 Honus Wagner – former Pittsburgh Pirate Hall of Fame shortstop, manager and hitting instructor
 Bill Wambsganss – second baseman in MLB
 Duke Welker – MLB pitcher
 Jayson Werth – MLB outfielder
 Vic Wertz – former MLB first baseman and outfielder
 Hoyt Wilhelm – Hall of Fame knuckleball pitcher in MLB
 Nick Wittgren – pitcher with the Miami Marlins
 Shawn Wooten – former MLB player
 Michael Wuertz – MLB pitcher
 Christian Yelich – MLB outfielder, great-grandson of Fred Gehrke
 Ryan Zimmerman – MLB player
 Jordan Zimmermann – MLB pitcher
 Ben Zobrist – MLB second baseman
 Bill Zuber – MLB pitcher, 1936–1947

Basketball

 Uwe Blab – former NBA center
 Buddy Boeheim – Syracuse University guard
 Jim Boeheim – Syracuse University NCAA basketball coach
 Carlos Boozer – professional basketball player born in West Germany in a U.S. Army base
 Shawn Bradley – former center in the NBA and for the Germany national basketball team
 Carl Braun – professional basketball player and coach
 Jon Brockman – professional basketball player
 Jud Buechler – former guard/forward with the NBA Chicago Bulls
 Jon Diebler – professional basketball player
 Demond Greene – professional basketball player for the Germany national team
 Isaiah Hartenstein – NBA Power Forward / Center
 Tom Heinsohn – professional basketball player and color commentator
 Fred Hetzel – retired NBA basketball player
 Kirk Hinrich – NBA guard for the Chicago Bulls
 Phil Jackson – New York Knicks team president, former NBA player and coach; Jackson's mother was part of a German Mennonite family
 Chris Kaman – center for the Los Angeles Clippers in the NBA and for the Germany national basketball team (dual citizen of the United States and of Germany)
 Lon Kruger – professional and college basketball coach
 Jon Leuer – professional basketball player
 Rebecca Lobo – television basketball analyst and a former player in the professional Women's National Basketball Association
 Drew Neitzel – All-American NCAA basketball player
 Jeff Neubauer – Western Kentucky University NCAA basketball coach
 Johnny Neumann – professional basketball player and coach
 Dirk Nowitzki – German player for Dallas Mavericks in NBA who applied for U.S. citizenship in 2011
 Greg Ostertag – NBA center
 Steve Prohm – college basketball coach
 Anthony Randolph – professional basketball player born in West Germany in a U.S. Army base
 Adolph Rupp – college basketball coach and Naismith Basketball Hall of Fame member
 Fred Schaus – basketball player, head coach and athletic director
 Detlef Schrempf – former NBA All-Star forward
 Akeem Vargas – professional basketball player for the Germany national team
 Jeff Walz – head coach of the women's basketball team at the University of Louisville

American Football

 John Alt – former offensive tackle in the NFL
 Jay Berwanger – the first recipient (1935) of the Downtown Athletic Club Trophy, renamed in 1936 as the Heisman Memorial Trophy.
 Kroy Biermann – NFL defensive end
 Tom Brady – quarterback, one of only two players to win five Super Bowls
 Dave Butz – NFL defensive lineman, selected to the NFL 1980s All-Decade Team
 Amon-Ra St. Brown – wide receiver for the Detroit Lions of the National Football League (NFL). He played college football at USC and was drafted by the Lions in the fourth round of the 2021 NFL Draft.
 Equanimeous St. Brown – wide receiver for the Chicago Bears of the National Football League (NFL). He played college football at Notre Dame and was drafted by the Green Bay Packers in the sixth round of the 2018 NFL Draft.
 Gunther Cunningham – American football head coach
 Fritz Crisler – NCAA football coach
 David Diehl – football player and NFL offensive lineman
 Dan Dierdorf – former NFL football player and current television sportscaster
 Conrad Dobler – former offensive lineman
 Chris Doering – former college and professional football player; wide receiver in the NFL
 Dave Duerson – safety in the NFL, two-time Super Bowl Champion
 Zach Ertz – tight end in the NFL
 Kirk Ferentz – head coach of University of Iowa Hawkeyes football
 Fred Gehrke – NFL halfback / defensive back and executive; great-grandfather of Milwaukee Brewers left fielder, Christian Yelich
 Jared Goff – quarterback
 Bob Griese – Hall of Fame quarterback
 Al Groh – NCCA Virginia football head coach and former NFL coach
 Hinkey Haines – NFL player and MLB player
 Don Hasselbeck – NFL
 Matt Hasselbeck – NFL football player
 Tim Hasselbeck  analyst and former professional quarterback
 Keith Heinrich – NFL tight end
 John Heisman – football player, coach, and namesake of the Heisman Trophy
 Kirk Herbstreit – former Ohio State University quarterback and analyst for ESPN's College GameDay
 Elroy "Crazy Legs" Hirsch – running back and receiver for the Los Angeles Rams and Chicago Rockets, nicknamed for his unusual running style
 Domenik Hixon – NFL wide receiver
 Jeff Hostetler – former NFL quarterback
 Harvey Jablonsky – football player and U.S. Army Veteran who was a 'highly decorated veteran' of both World War II and later in his career the Vietnam War, elected to the College Football Hall of Fame in 1978
 Brett Keisel – defensive end for the Pittsburgh Steelers
 Don Klosterman – quarterback
 Jonathan Klinsmann – son of Jürgen Klinsmann, goalkeeper for LA Galaxy
 Dan Kreider – fullback in the NFL
 Dave Krieg – former NFL Seattle Seahawks quarterback
 Clint Kriewaldt – linebacker in the NFL
 Luke Kuechly – linebacker in the National Football League
 John Kuhn – fullback, currently playing for the Green Bay Packers
 Kory Lichtensteiger – NFL center
 Lex Luger – former football player and professional wrestler
 Todd Marinovich – former NFL American and Canadian football quarterback
 Zach Mettenberger – LSU and NFL quarterback
 Christian Mohr – NFL defensive end
 Nesser brothers – group of football playing brothers who helped make up the most famous football family in the United States, 1907–mid-1920s
 John Nesser: born April 25, 1875, in Triere, Germany, and died August 1, 1931, in Columubus, Ohio
 John Peter Nesser: born October 22, 1877, in Triere, Germany, and died May 29, 1954, in Columbus, Ohio
 Philipp Gregory Nesser: born December 10, 1880, in Triere, Germany, and died May 9, 1959, in Columbus, Ohio
 Theodore H. (Ted) Nesser: born April 8, 1883, in Dennison, Ohio, and died June 7, 1941, in Columbus, Ohio
 Frederick William Nesser: born September 10, 1887, in Columbus, Ohio, and died July 2, 1967, in Columbus, Ohio
 Francis Raymond (Frank) Nesser: born June 3, 1889, in Columbus, Ohio, and died January 1, 1953, in Columbus, Ohio
 Alfred Louis Nesser: born June 6, 1893, in Columbus, Ohio, and died March 11, 1967, in Columbus, Ohio
 Raymond Joseph Nesser: born March 22, 1898, in Columbus, Ohio, and died September 2, 1969, in Columbus, Ohio
 Rick Neuheisel – football coach
 Ray Nitschke – Hall of Fame football player
 Brock Osweiler – NFL quarterback
 Tyler Ott – long snapper
 Jim Otto – former Oakland Raider offensive lineman
 Robin Pflugrad – college football coach
 Ricky Proehl – former NFL wide receiver, two-time Super Bowl Champion
 George Ratterman – former player in the All-America Football Conference and the NFL
 Ben Roethlisberger – Pittsburgh Steelers Quarterback of Swiss-German descent, two-time Super Bowl Champion
 Rudy Ruettiger – former player at Holy Cross College (1972–1974) and Notre Dame
 George Sauer – former American football player, coach, college sports administrator, and professional football executive
 George Sauer Jr. – wide receiver who played six seasons for the American Football League's New York Jets
 Matt Schaub – NFL quarterback
 Bo Schembechler – former NCAA football coach at the University of Michigan
 Anthony Schlegel – former linebacker
 Cory Schlesinger – NFL fullback
 Blake Schlueter – former American football and NCAA TCU center
 Francis Schmidt – college football coach inducted into the College Football Hall of Fame
 Joe Schmidt – former 1950s NFL football player and coach
 Owen Schmitt – NFL fullback
 John Schneider – professional American football player in the Ohio League and the early National Football League for the Columbus Panhandles
 John Schneider – professional American football executive
 Joe Schobert – linebacker
 Turk Schonert – former NFL quarterback
 Jay Schroeder – former professional quarterback in the NFL
 Geoff Schwartz – NFL offensive lineman
 Mitchell Schwartz – NFL offensive tackle
 Jim Schwartz – NFL head coach
 Stephen Spach – NFL tight end
 Matt Spaeth – tight end for the Pittsburgh Steelers
 Roger Staubach – Heisman Trophy winner and Hall of Fame quarterback for the Dallas Cowboys
 Eric Steinbach – NFL offensive lineman
 Zach Strief – NFL offensive lineman
 Harry Stuhldreher – football player, coach, and college athletics administrator
 Zach Sudfeld – NFL tight end
 Nate Sudfeld – quarterback
 Mike Tannenbaum – professional football executive, who is currently the Executive Vice President of Football Operations for the Miami Dolphins and former general manager for the New York Jets
 Jim Tressel – college head football coach
 Brian Urlacher – Pro Bowl linebacker for the Chicago Bears
 Sebastian Vollmer – NFL offensive Lineman
 Kimo von Oelhoffen – NFL linebacker
 Uwe von Schamann – former NFL kicker
 Mike Wagner – safety for the Pittsburgh Steelers, 1971–1980; member of the famed Steel Curtain defense; played in two Pro Bowls
 Charlie Weis – NFL football coach
 Wes Welker – NFL wide receiver, punt returner, and kick returner
 Carson Wentz – football quarterback for the North Dakota State Bison
 Björn Werner – NFL linebacker
 Matt Wilhelm – NFL linebacker
 Danny Wuerffel – former NFL quarterback and 1996 Heisman Trophy winner
 Zach Zenner – NFL running back
 Jim Zorn – Seattle Seahawks quarterback

Golf

 Jason Dufner – professional golfer and 2013 PGA Championship winner
 Walter Hagen – golf legend
 Jack Nicklaus – professional golfer; won 18 career major championships on the PGA Tour over a span of 24 years
 Jordan Spieth – professional golfer, 2015 Masters Tournament winner with a score of 18 under par
 Tom Weiskopf – professional golfer

Ice hockey
 David Backes – professional NHL hockey player
 Mathew Dumba – professional NHL hockey player
 Christian Ehrhoff – professional NHL hockey player
 Jack Eichel – professional NHL hockey player
 Gabe Guentzel – professional ice hockey player
 Jake Guentzel – professional NHL hockey player
 Chris Kreider – hockey player
 Cody Lampl – professional ice hockey player
 Jamie Langenbrunner – NHL and U.S. Olympic hockey player
 Peter Mueller – professional NHL hockey player
 Jed Ortmeyer – professional hockey player
 Rob Schremp – professional hockey player
 Jordan Schroeder – ice hockey player
 Dennis Seidenberg – professional NHL hockey player
 Tim Schaller – professional NHL hockey player
 R. J. Umberger – professional NHL hockey player

Soccer

 Walter Bahr – long-time captain of the U.S. national team, played in the 1950 FIFA World Cup when the U.S. defeated England 1–0
 Nicole Barnhart – Olympic medalist and professional soccer player
 Kyle Beckerman – midfielder
 Justin Braun – forward for Chivas USA
 Eric Brunner – soccer player who currently plays for Portland Timbers in Major League Soccer
 Rachel Buehler – Olympic medalist and professional soccer player
 Timothy Chandler – right back for Eintracht Frankfurt in the Bundesliga
 Jimmy Conrad – center back
 Dietrich Albrecht – U.S. national team
 Thomas Dooley – long-time member and former captain of the United States national team
 Greg Eckhardt – American soccer player in Finland
 Whitney Engen – professional soccer player
 Brad Friedel – U.S. National Team, Premier League goalkeeper for Aston Villa
 Julian Green – professional soccer player
 Marcus Hahnemann – soccer goalkeeper for the U.S. National Team and Wovlerhampton Wanderers in the Premier League
 Aaron Hohlbein – soccer player who currently plays for Fort Lauderdale Strikers in the North American Soccer League
 David Horst – soccer player currently playing for Portland Timbers in Major League Soccer
 Kasey Keller – goalkeeper
 Jerome Kiesewetter – forward currently playing for VfB Stuttgart in the Bundesliga in Germany
 Meghan Klingenberg – professional soccer player
 Jonathan Klinsmann – son of Jürgen Klinsmann, player for LA Galaxy
 Jürgen Klinsmann – professional football manager notably, Bundesliga club Bayern Munich and the United States national team and former player, a naturalized U.S. citizen.
 Ali Krieger – professional soccer player
 Fabian Johnson – professional soccer player for the U.S. national team; born and raised in Berlin
 Steven Lenhart – soccer player for the Columbus Crew
 Joanna Lohman – professional soccer player
 Fred Lutkefedder – member of the U.S. soccer team at the 1936 Summer Olympics and Philadelphia German-Americans of the American Soccer League
 Chris Rolfe – American soccer player playing in Denmark
 Sigi Schmid – Major League Soccer manager
 Chris Seitz – goalkeeper for the Philadelphia Union
 Jonathan Spector – soccer (football) player for the U.S. National Team and West Ham United in the Premier League
 Seth Stammler – plays for the New York Red Bulls
 Zack Steffen – goalkeeper for Manchester City
 Taylor Twellman – retired professional soccer player
 Abby Wambach – Olympic medalist and professional soccer player
 Andrew Wiedeman – currently plays for FC Dallas in Major League Soccer
 Josh Wolff – forward, currently a free agent
 Gotoku Sakai

Tennis
 Bob Falkenburg – tennis player and 1948 Wimbledon Champion
 Liezel Huber – professional tennis player
 Sam Warburg – tennis player
 John Whitlinger – former professional tennis player
 Tami Whitlinger – former professional tennis player

Boxing, Mixed Martial Arts, Wrestling

 Max Baer – boxer, heavyweight boxing champion of the world
 Shayna Baszler – professional wrestler and mixed martial artist, her father is of German descent
 Mac Danzig – professional mixed martial arts fighter and instructor, and is a former lightweight champion for the King of the Cage and Gladiator Challenge mixed martial arts organizations
 Ted DiBiase – former professional wrestler
 Ted DiBiase Jr. – former professional wrestler
 Harry Greb – professional boxer, nicknamed "The Pittsburgh Windmill", he was the American Light Heavyweight Champion, 1922–1923 and World Middleweight Champion, 1923–1926
 April Hunter – professional wrestler, professional wrestling valet and fitness and glamour model
 Nia Jax – professional wrestler
 Brock Lesnar – professional wrestler and MMA fighter
 Mercedes Varnado – professional wrestler known in the WWE as "Sasha Banks" and formerly known as "Mercedes KV"
 David Schultz – retired professional wrestler, known by his ring name "Dr. D"
 Ryan Schultz – professional mixed martial arts (MMA) fighter, currently fighting for the Portland Wolfpack of the International Fight League
 Chael Sonnen – professional mixed martial arts (MMA) fighter, politician and actor
 Gus Sonnenberg – professional wrestler and boxer
 Seth Rollins – professional wrestler
 Jon Heidenreich – former professional wrestler and former football player
Katarina Waters - professional wrestler

Other sports
 Lisa Aukland – professional bodybuilder and powerlifter
 Earl W. Bascom – professional rodeo cowboy, inductee in several rodeo halls of fame
 Tony Bettenhausen and his race-driving sons Gary, Tony Jr., and Merle; Tony was at times nicknamed "Der Panzer" due to his ancestry and driving style
 Jana Bieger – two-time World Champion artistic gymnast
 Gretchen Bleiler – professional halfpipe snowboarder and pioneer
 Greg Bretz – Olympic snowboarder
 George Brosius – gymnastics teacher associated from 1854 to 1915 with the Milwaukee Turnverein, he served in the Union Army from 1861 to 1864
 Dale Earnhardt – race car driver in NASCAR's top division
 Dale Earnhardt Jr. – semi-retired professional stock car racing driver, team owner, author analyst for NASCAR on NBC
 Gertrude Ederle – Olympic Gold Medal winner and first woman to swim the English Channel
 George Eyser – gymnast who competed in the 1904 Summer Olympics with a wooden leg
 Bobby Fischer – chess grandmaster and World Chess Champion between 1972 and 1975
 Christopher Fogt – Army captain who won a bronze medal at the 2014 Olympic Games in Sochi as a member of the famed Team Night Train
 Gretchen Fraser – alpine ski racer; first American to win an Olympic gold medal for skiing
 Archie Hahn – sprinter in the early 20th century
 Hans Halberstadt – Olympic fencer
 J. R. Hildebrand – Formula One and IndyCar Series race car driver
 Margaret Hoelzer – Olympic swimmer
 Katie Hoff – Olympic medal-winning swimmer
 Mark Geiger – soccer referee in Major League Soccer in the United States and Canada, as well as CONCACAF and the World Cup
 Harry Greb – professional boxer, nicknamed "The Pittsburgh Windmill", he was the American Light Heavyweight Champion, 1922–1923 and World Middleweight Champion, 1923–1926
 Kasey Kahne – dirt track racing driver and former professional stock car racing driver
 Evel Knievel – motorcycle daredevil
 Henry Laskau – racewalker
 Helene Mayer – Olympic champion fencer
 Kimmie Meissner – U.S. national champion figure skater
 Josef Newgarden – IndyCar Series driver, driving the 21 car for Ed Carpenter Racing
 Jordan Niebrugge – amateur golfer currently playing collegiate golf at Oklahoma State University
 Robert Oberst – professional strongman
 Michael Phelps – swimmer; has won 16 Olympic medals
 Craig Sager – sports journalist for TBS and TNT
 Allison Schmitt – swimmer
 Lacy Schnoor – Olympic skier
 Mark Spitz – swimmer and Olympic gold medalist
 Sara Studebaker – biathlete who has competed on the World Cup circuit
 Dana Vollmer – swimmer and Olympic gold medalist
 Lindsey Vonn – alpine skier
 Thomas Vonn – alpine skier
 Rudolph "Minnesota Fats" Wanderone (1913–1996) – perhaps the best known pool player in the United States
 Dick Weber – bowling professional and a founding member of the Professional Bowlers Association (PBA), father of Pete Weber
 Pete Weber – bowling professional on the Professional Bowlers Association (PBA) Tour
 Richard Weiss – slalom canoer
 Johnny Weissmuller – swimmer, Olympic gold medalist
 Rasa von Werder – bodybuilder
 Waldemar von Zedtwitz – German-born American bridge player and administrator

See also
 German Texan
 List of Germans
 German Canadians
 List of German Texans
 List of Amish and their descendants
 List of German inventors and discoverers
 German Americans in the American Civil War
 German-American Heritage Foundation of the USA

References

Bibliography

External links
 German-American Corner: History and Heritage

 
Americans
Lists of American people by ethnic or national origin
Americans
Lists of people by ethnicity